= Apheresis =

Medical techniques to separate one or more components of blood

- Whole blood enters the centrifuge (1) and separates into plasma (2), leukocytes (3), and erythrocytes (4). Selected components are then drawn off (5).
- MeSH: D016238

Apheresis (ἀφαίρεσις (aphairesis, "a taking away")) is a medical technology in which the blood of a person is passed through an apparatus that separates one particular constituent and returns the remainder to the circulation. It is thus an extracorporeal therapy.

One of the uses of apheresis is for collecting hematopoietic stem cells.

== Method ==
Depending on the substance that is being removed, different processes are employed in apheresis. If separation by density is required, centrifugation is the most common method. Other methods involve absorption onto beads coated with an absorbent material and filtration.

The centrifugation method can be divided into two basic categories:

=== Continuous flow centrifugation ===
Continuous flow centrifugation (CFC) historically required two venipunctures, as "continuous" means the blood is collected, spun, and returned simultaneously. Newer systems can operate with a single venipuncture by collecting blood in a vessel and alternating between drawing and returning it through the same needle, while the centrifuge continuously processes the blood held in the vessel. The main advantage of this system is the low extracorporeal volume (calculated by volume of the apheresis chamber, the donor's hematocrit, and total blood volume of the donor) used in the procedure, which may be advantageous in the elderly and for children.

=== Intermittent flow centrifugation ===
Intermittent flow centrifugation (IFC) works in cycles, taking blood, spinning/processing it and then giving back the unused parts to the donor in a bolus. The main advantage is a single venipuncture site. It does require a larger extracorporeal volume and takes significantly longer to perform the procedure via IFC. As a result, it is less commonly used for therapeutic purposes and is more frequently found in Donation Center settings. To stop the blood from coagulating, an anticoagulant is automatically mixed with the blood as it is pumped from the body into the apheresis machine.

=== Centrifugation variables ===
The centrifugation process itself has four variables that can be controlled to selectively remove desired components. The first is spin speed and bowl diameter, the second is "sit time" in the centrifuge, the third is solutes added, and the fourth is not as easily controllable: plasma volume and cellular content of the donor. The result in most cases is the classic sedimented blood sample with the RBCs at the bottom, the buffy coat of platelets and WBCs (lymphocytes, granulocytes, monocytes) in the middle and the plasma on top.

== Types ==
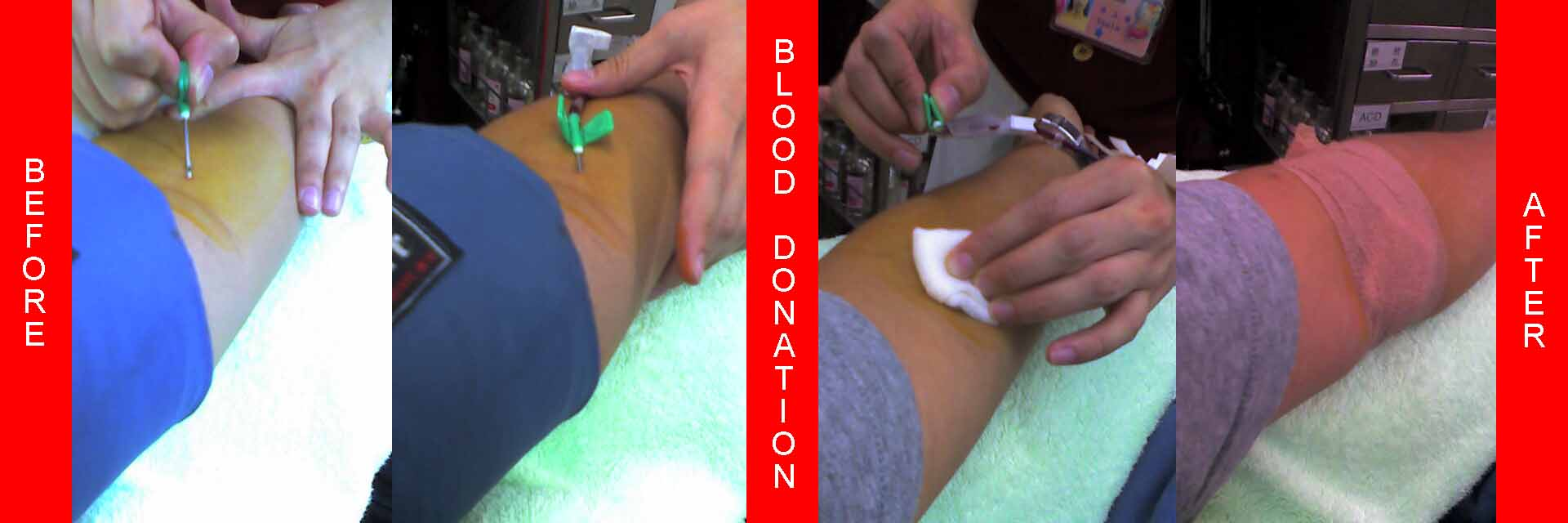
Disinfect, insert the cannula, pull out the cannula, and dress the wound. The blue pressure cuff is controlled by the platelet apheresis machine in newer models.

There are numerous types of apheresis.

=== Donation ===
Blood taken from a healthy donor can be separated into its parts during blood donation, where the needed component is collected and the unharvested components are returned to the donor. Fluid replacement is usually not needed in this type of collection. In many countries, apheresis donors can donate platelets more often than those donating whole blood. There are several categories of component collections:

- Plasmapheresis – blood plasma. Plasmapheresis is useful in collecting FFP (fresh frozen plasma) of a particular ABO group. Commercial uses aside from FFP for this procedure include immunoglobulin products, plasma derivatives, and the collection of rare WBC and RBC antibodies.

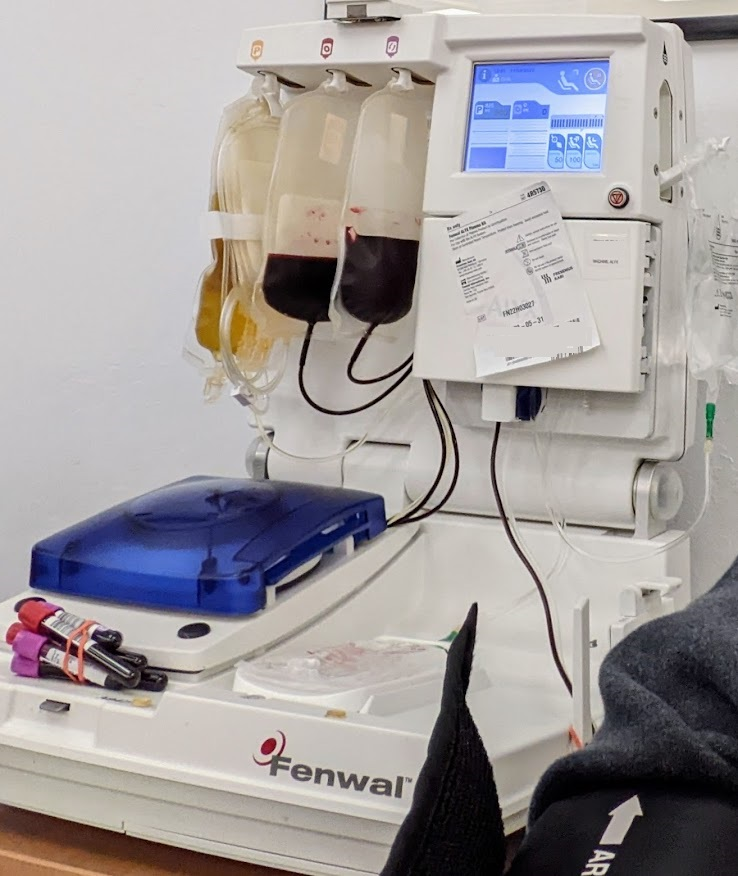
A Fenwal Erythropheresis machine is being used for plasmapheresis.

- Erythrocytapheresis – red blood cells. Erythrocytapheresis is the separation of erythrocytes from whole blood. It is most commonly accomplished using the method of centrifugal sedimentation. The automated red blood cell collection procedure for donating erythrocytes is referred to as 'Double Reds' or 'Double Red Cell Apheresis.'
- Plateletpheresis (thrombapheresis, thrombocytapheresis) – blood platelets. Plateletpheresis is the collection of platelets by apheresis while returning the RBCs, WBCs, and component plasma. The yield is normally the equivalent of between six and ten random platelet concentrates. Quality control demands the platelets from apheresis be equal to or greater than 3.0 × 10^{11} in number and have a pH of equal to or greater than 6.2 in 90% of the products tested and must be used within five days.
- Leukapheresis – leukocytes (white blood cells). Leukopheresis is the removal of PMNs, basophils, eosinophils for transfusion into patients whose PMNs are ineffective or where traditional therapy has failed. There is limited data to suggest the benefit of granulocyte transfusion. The complications of this procedure are the difficulty in collection and short shelf life (24 hours at 20 to 24 °C). Since the "buffy coat" layer sits directly atop the RBC layer, HES, a sedimenting agent, is employed to improve yield while minimizing RBC collection. Quality control demands the resultant concentrate be 1.0 × 10^{10} granulocytes in 75% of the units tested and that the product be irradiated to avoid graft-versus-host disease (inactivate lymphocytes). Irradiation does not affect PMN function. Since there is usually a small amount of RBCs collected, ABO compatibility should be employed when feasible.
- Stem cell harvesting – hematopoietic stem cells. Circulating peripheral blood stem cells (PBSCs) are harvested to use in peripheral stem cell transplantation following administration of a mobilizing agent, such as granulocyte colony stimulating factor (G-CSF).
- Lymphapheresis – lymphocytes. Lymphocytes are harvested to use in manufacture of CAR T cell products for T-cell-based immunotherapies.

==== Donor safety ====
- Single use kits – Apheresis is done using single-use kits, so there is no risk of infection from blood-contaminated tubing or centrifuge. Blood does not contact the device and during the separation, blood does not exit the kit.
- Reinfusion – At the end of the procedure, the remaining blood in the kit is given back to the donor with a process called 'reinfusion'.
- Immune system effects – "the immediate decreases in blood lymphocyte counts and serum immunoglobulin concentrations are of slight to moderate degree and are without known adverse effects. Less information is available regarding long-term alterations of the immune system".

===== Kit problems =====
Two apheresis kit recalls were:

- Baxter Healthcare Corporation (2005), in which "pinhole leaks were observed at the two-omega end of the umbilicus (multilumen tubing), causing a blood leak."
- Fenwal Incorporated (2007), in which there were "two instances where the anticoagulant citrate dextrose (ACD) and saline lines were reversed in the assembly process. The reversed line connections may not be visually apparent in the monitor box, and could result in excessive ACD infusion and severe injury, including death, to the donor."

===== Donor selection =====
People who do not use a drug that may prevent blood donation, who do not have the risk of the carrier of a disease, and who have suitable vascular structure may be apheresis donors. For apheresis platelet donation the donor's pre platelet count should be above 150 x 10^9/L. For apheresis plasma donation, the donor's total protein level should be greater than 60 g/L. For double red cell apheresis, donors of either gender require a minimum hemoglobin level of 14.0 g/dl.

===== Plasticizer exposure =====
Apheresis uses plastics and tubing, which come into contact with the blood. The plastics are made of PVC in addition to additives such as a plasticizer, often DEHP. DEHP leaches from the plastic into the blood, and people have begun to study the possible effects of this leached DEHP on donors as well as transfusion recipients.

- "current risk or preventive limit values for DEHP such as the RfD of the US EPA (20 μg/kg/day) and the TDI of the European Union (20–48 μg/kg/day) can be exceeded on the day of the plateletpheresis. ... Especially women in their reproductive age need to be protected from DEHP exposures exceeding the above mentioned preventive limit values."
- "Commercial plateletpheresis disposables release considerable amounts of DEHP during the apheresis procedure, but the total dose of DEHP retained by the donor is within the normal range of DEHP exposure of the general population."
- The Baxter company manufactured blood bags without DEHP, but there was little demand for the product in the marketplace
- "Mean DEHP doses for both plateletpheresis techniques (18.1 and 32.3 μg/kg/day) were close to or exceeded the reference dose (RfD) of the US EPA and tolerable daily intake (TDI) value of the EU on the day of the apheresis. Therefore, margins of safety might be insufficient to protect especially young men and women in their reproductive age from effects on reproductivity. At present, discontinuous-flow devices should be preferred to avert conceivable health risks from plateletpheresis donors. Strategies to avoid DEHP exposure of donors during apheresis need to be developed."

=== Therapy ===
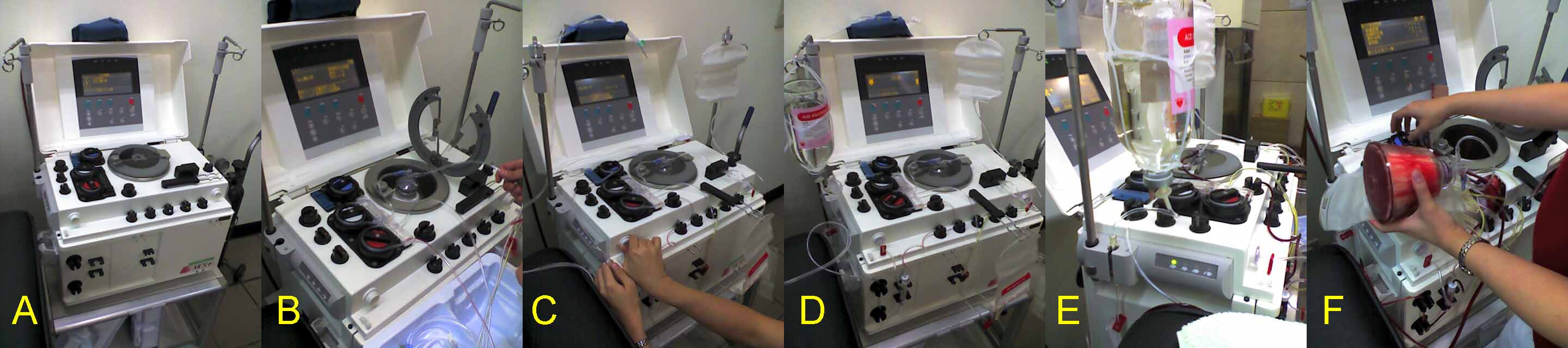
The assembly (A–D), operation (E) and disassembly (F) of the platelet apheresis machine, which can be configured to separate other components as well

The various apheresis techniques may be used whenever the removed constituent is causing severe symptoms of disease. Generally, apheresis has to be performed fairly often, and is an invasive process. It is therefore only employed if other means to control a particular disease have failed, or the symptoms are of such a nature that waiting for medication to become effective would cause suffering or risk of complications. For autoimmune diseases in which apheresis is effective, it is used not as a standalone treatment, but rather in conjunction with therapies that reduce production of autoantibodies.

- Plasma exchange – removal of the liquid portion of blood to remove harmful substances. The plasma is replaced with a replacement solution.
- LDL apheresis – removal of low density lipoprotein in patients with familial hypercholesterolemia.
- Lipoprotein(a) (Lp(a) apheresis
- Photopheresis – used to treat graft-versus-host disease, cutaneous T-cell lymphoma, and rejection in heart transplantation.
- Immunoadsorption with Staphylococcal protein A-agarose column – removal of allo- and autoantibodies (in autoimmune diseases, transplant rejection, hemophilia) by directing plasma through protein A-agarose columns. Protein A is a cell wall component produced by several strains of Staphylococcus aureus which binds to the Fc region of IgG.
- Leukocytapheresis – removal of malignant white blood cells in people with leukemia and very high white blood cell counts causing symptoms.
- Erythrocytapheresis – removal of erythrocytes (red blood cells) in people with iron overload as a result of Hereditary haemochromatosis. This process is also used for exchange transfusion in severe malaria, or in sickle cell patients with specific indications such as acute chest syndrome or stroke.
- Thrombocytapheresis – removal of platelets in people with symptoms from extreme elevations in platelet count such as those with essential thrombocythemia or polycythemia vera.

== Indications ==
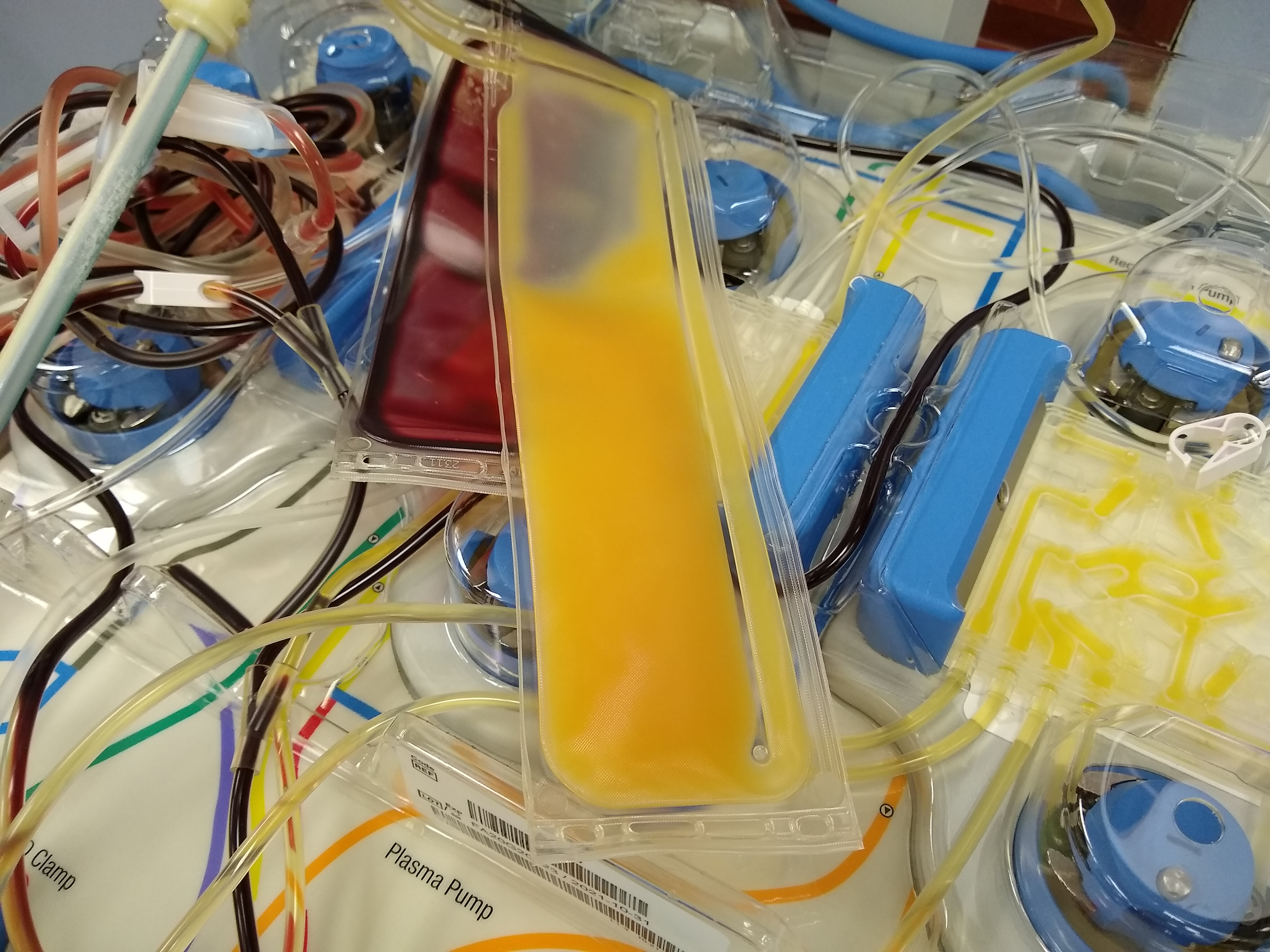
Platelets collected by using apheresis at an American Red Cross donation center

=== ASFA categories ===
In 2023, the American Society for Apheresis published the 9th Special Edition of evidence based guidelines for the practice of Apheresis Medicine. These guidelines are based upon a systematic review of available scientific literature. Clinical utility for a given disease is denoted by assignment of an ASFA Category (I – IV). The quality and strength of evidence are denoted by standard GRADE recommendations. ASFA Categories are defined as follows:

- **Category I** for disorders where therapeutic apheresis is accepted as a first line treatment,
- **Category II** for disorders where therapeutic apheresis is accepted as a second-line treatment,
- **Category III** for disorders where the optimal role of therapeutic apheresis is not clearly established and
- **Category IV** for disorders where therapeutic apheresis is considered ineffective or harmful.

=== Diseases and disorders ===
Only diseases (or mentioned special conditions thereof) with ASFA category I or II are displayed in bold, with category I being underlined in addition.

Disease	Special condition	ABO-incompatible hematopoietic stem cell transplantation		Plasmapheresis	II
ABO-incompatible solid organ transplantation	**Kidney**	Plasmapheresis	II		
ABO-incompatible solid organ transplantation	**Heart (<40 months of age)**	Plasmapheresis	II		
ABO-incompatible solid organ transplantation	Liver (perioperative)	Plasmapheresis	III		
Acute disseminated encephalomyelitis		Plasmapheresis	II		
Acute inflammatory demyelinating polyneuropathy		Plasmapheresis	I		
Acute liver failure		Plasmapheresis	III		
Age-related macular degeneration (AMD)	Dry AMD	Rheopheresis	III		
Systemic amyloidosis		Plasmapheresis	IV		
Amyotrophic lateral sclerosis		Plasmapheresis	IV		
Anti-neutrophil cytoplasmic antibody-associated rapidly progressive glomerulonephritis	Dialysis dependence	Plasmapheresis	III		
Anti-neutrophil cytoplasmic antibody-associated rapidly progressive glomerulonephritis	Diffuse alveolar hemorrhage (DAH)	Plasmapheresis	III		
Anti-neutrophil cytoplasmic antibody-associated rapidly progressive glomerulonephritis	Dialysis independence	Plasmapheresis	III		
Goodpasture syndrome	**Dialysis independence**	Plasmapheresis	I		
Goodpasture syndrome	**Diffuse alveolar hemorrhage (DAH)**	Plasmapheresis	I		
Goodpasture syndrome	Dialysis dependence and no DAH	Plasmapheresis	III		
Aplastic anemia or pure red cell aplasia	Aplastic anemia	Plasmapheresis	III		
Aplastic anemia or pure red cell aplasia	**Pure red cell aplasia**	Plasmapheresis	II		
Autoimmune hemolytic anemia	Warm antibody autoimmune hemolytic anemia	Plasmapheresis	III		
Autoimmune hemolytic anemia	**Cold agglutinin disease, life-threatening**	Plasmapheresis	II		
Babesiosis	**Severe**	Erythrocytapheresis	I		
Babesiosis	**High-risk population**	Erythrocytapheresis	II		
Burn with circulatory shock		Plasmapheresis	IV		
Heart transplant with allograft	**Prophylaxis of rejection**	Photopheresis	I		
Heart transplant with allograft	**Treatment of rejection**	Photopheresis	II		
Heart transplant with allograft	**Treatment of antibody-mediated rejection**	Plasmapheresis	I		
Catastrophic antiphospholipid syndrome		Plasmapheresis	I		
Rasmussen's encephalitis		Plasmapheresis or immunoadsorption	II		
Chronic inflammatory demyelinating polyneuropathy		Plasmapheresis	I		
Coagulation factor inhibitors		Immunoadsorption	III		
Coagulation factor inhibitors		Plasmapheresis	III		
Cryoglobulinemia	**Severe/symptomatic**	Plasmapheresis	II		
Cryoglobulinemia	**Secondary to Hepatitis C**	Immunoadsorption	II		
Cutaneous T cell lymphoma: mycosis fungoides or Sézary disease	**Erythrodermic**	Photopheresis	I		
Cutaneous T cell lymphoma: mycosis fungoides or Sézary disease	Non-erythrodermic	Photopheresis	III		
Dermatomyositis or polymyositis		Plasmapheresis	IV		
Dermatomyositis or polymyositis		Leukapheresis	IV		
Dilated cardiomyopathy	NYHA class II-IV	Immunoadsorption or plasmapheresis	III		
Familial hypercholesterolemia	**Homozygotes**	LDL apheresis	I		
Familial hypercholesterolemia	**Heterozygotes**	LDL apheresis	II		
Familial hypercholesterolemia	**Homozygotes with small blood volume**	Plasmapheresis	II		
Focal segmental glomerulosclerosis	**Recurrent**	Plasmapheresis	I		
Graft-versus-host disease	**Skin**	Photopheresis	II		
Graft-versus-host disease	Non-skin	Photopheresis	II		
Hemolytic disease of the fetus and newborn	**Before intrauterine transfusion availability**	Plasmapheresis	III		
Hereditary haemochromatosis		Erythrocytapheresis	III		
Hemolytic–uremic syndrome (HUS)	**Atypical HUS due to mutations in complement factor genes**	Plasmapheresis	II		
Hemolytic–uremic syndrome (HUS)	**Atypical HUS due to factor H autoantibodies**	Plasmapheresis	I		
Hemolytic–uremic syndrome (HUS)	Typical HUS, or diarrhea-associated HUS	Plasmapheresis	III		
Leukocytosis	**Leukostasis**	Leukapheresis	III		
Leukocytosis	Prophylaxis of leukostasis	Leukapheresis	III		
Hyperviscosity in monoclonal gammopathy	**Treatment of symptoms**	Plasmapheresis	I		
Hyperviscosity in monoclonal gammopathy	**Prophylaxis in rituximab**	Plasmapheresis	I		
Immune thrombocytopenic purpura		Plasmapheresis	IV		
Immune complex-type of rapidly progressive glomerulonephritis		Plasmapheresis	III		
Inclusion body myositis		Plasmapheresis or leukapheresis	IV		
Inflammatory bowel disease		Leukapheresis	II		
Kidney transplantation	**Antibody-mediated rejection**	Plasmapheresis	I		
Kidney transplantation	**Desensitization in living donor in positive crossmatch due to donor specific HLA antibody**	Plasmapheresis	I		
Kidney transplantation	High PRA and cadaveric donor	Plasmapheresis	III		
Lambert–Eaton myasthenic syndrome		Plasmapheresis	II		
Lung transplantation	**Allograft rejection**	Plasmapheresis	II		
Malaria	**Severe**	Erythrocytapheresis	II		
Multiple sclerosis	**Acute inflammatory demyelinating diseases of the central nervous system, unresponsive to steroids**	Plasmapheresis	II		
Multiple sclerosis	Chronic progressive	Plasmapheresis	III		
Myasthenia gravis	**Moderate to severe**	Plasmapheresis	I		
Myasthenia gravis	**Pre-thymectomy**	Plasmapheresis	I		
Myeloma cast nephropathy		Plasmapheresis	II		
Nephrogenic systemic fibrosis		Photopheresis or Plasmapheresis	III		
Neuromyelitis optica		Plasmapheresis	II		
Venoms, poisoning and overdose	**Mushroom poisoning**	Plasmapheresis	II		
Venoms, poisoning and overdose	Other	Plasmapheresis	III		
Paraneoplastic syndrome	Neurologic	Plasmapheresis or immunoadsorption	III		
Pancreatitis	Secondary to hypertriglyceridemia	Plasmapheresis	III		
Polyneuropathy due to monoclonal gammopathy	**IgG, IgA or IgM**	Plasmapheresis	I		
Polyneuropathy due to monoclonal gammopathy	Multiple myeloma	Plasmapheresis	III		
Polyneuropathy due to monoclonal gammopathy	IgG/IgA or IgM	Immunoadsorption	III		
PANDAS and Sydenham's chorea		Plasmapheresis	I		
Pemphigus vulgaris		Plasmapheresis	IV		
Pemphigus vulgaris		Photopheresis	III		
Refsum disease		Plasmapheresis	II		
Polycythemia vera or erythrocytosis		Erythrocytapheresis	III		
POEMS syndrome		Plasmapheresis	IV		
Post-transfusion purpura		Plasmapheresis	III		
Psoriasis		Plasmapheresis	IV		
Rheumatoid arthritis	**Refractory**	Immunoadsorption	II		
Schizophrenia		Plasmapheresis	IV		
Systemic scleroderma		Plasmapheresis	III		
Systemic scleroderma		Photopheresis	IV		
Sepsis with multi-organ failure		Plasmapheresis	III		
Sickle cell disease	**Acute stroke**	Erythrocytapheresis	I		
Sickle cell disease	**Acute chest syndrome**	Erythrocytapheresis	II		
Sickle cell disease	**Prophylaxis of stroke or transfusional iron overload**	Erythrocytapheresis	II		
Sickle cell disease	Multi-organ failure	Erythrocytapheresis	III		
Stiff-person syndrome		Plasmapheresis	IV		
Systemic lupus erythematosus	**Severe, such as cerebritis or diffuse alveolar hemorrhage**	Plasmapheresis	II		
Systemic lupus erythematosus	Nephritis	Plasmapheresis	IV		
Thrombocytosis	**Symptomatic**	Plateletpheresis	II		
Thrombocytosis	Prophylactic	Plateletpheresis	III		
Thrombotic microangiopathy, drug-associated	**Ticlopidine**	Plasmapheresis	I		
Thrombotic microangiopathy, drug-associated	Cyclosporine; Tacrolimus; Clopidogrel	Plasmapheresis	III		
Thrombotic microangiopathy, drug-associated	Gemcitabine; Quinine	Plasmapheresis	IV		
Thrombotic microangiopathy, hematopoietic stem cell transplantation-related		Plasmapheresis	III		
Thrombotic thrombocytopenic purpura		Plasmapheresis	I		
Thyroid storm		Plasmapheresis	III		
Wilson's disease	**Fulminant hepatic failure with hemolysis**	Plasmapheresis	I		

== Fluid replacement during apheresis ==
When an apheresis system is used for therapy, the system is removing relatively small amounts of fluid (not more than 10.5 mL/kg body weight). That fluid must be replaced to keep correct intravascular volume. The fluid replaced is different at different institutions. If a crystalloid like normal saline (NS) is used, the infusion amount should be triple what is removed as the 3:1 ratio of normal saline for plasma is needed to keep up oncotic pressure. Some institutions use human serum albumin, but it is costly and can be difficult to find. Routine use of fresh frozen plasma (FFP) is not generally appropriate because of the dangers including citrate toxicity (from the anticoagulant), ABO incompatibility, infection, and allergic reactions. However, FFP should be used in cases of thrombotic thrombocytopenic purpura or patients at high risk of bleeding.

== See also ==
- Leukoreduction
- Plasmapheresis
- Venipuncture
- Pediatric Apheresis
