= American Society for Apheresis =

The American Society for Apheresis (ASFA) is an organization of physicians, scientists, nurses, and allied health professionals whose mission is to advance apheresis medicine for patients, donors and practitioners through education, evidence-based practice, research and advocacy. ASFA represents a broad range of health care professionals involved in apheresis medicine including those practicing pathology, transplantation, hematology, oncology, neurology, rheumatology, nephrology, hepatology, gastroenterology, cardiology, and ophthalmology. These health care providers are involved in the performance of therapeutic apheresis procedures including plasma exchange, red cell exchange, leukocytapheresis, plateletapheresis, photopheresis, LDL apheresis, and hematopoietic progenitor cell collection. ASFA also represents those physicians and allied health professionals involved in the collection of blood products from blood donors using apheresis instruments.

The major activities of ASFA are member driven and educational, including publication of the Journal of Clinical Apheresis Special Issue: Clinical Applications of Therapeutic Apheresis: An Evidence Based Approach, publication of Principles of Apheresis Technology Textbook, publication of Therapeutic Apheresis: A Physician's Handbook, monthly apheresis educational webinar program and developing programming for the ASFA Annual Meeting.

ASFA was formed in 1982. It grew from the merger of two organizations, the Society of Hemapheresis Specialists (SHS) and the original ASFA. The SHS was formed by nursing and allied health personnel, who were responsible for performing the donor and therapeutic procedures and operating the various blood cell separators. It was formed provide educational and networking opportunities in the field of apheresis medicine that were not available and which were needed by the original members in order to advance the field. SHS became a national forum for the exchange of views and best practices and was the forerunner of the efforts directed toward apheresis practitioner certification.

The original ASFA developed from a physician-scientist symposia. It was originally developed for the purpose to present scientific research on donor and therapeutic apheresis topics. The first apheresis symposium was held in Chicago in 1979, and was the first of annual symposia. The subsequent symposia were named the ASFA Symposia. Most of the initial Officers and Board of Directors of ASFA presented at these symposia, from which the structure of the organization grew. In 1982, John Verrier-Jones, became the first president of ASFA. He noted that the term “apheresis” had been in use since 1914, and that the appropriate terms was “apheresis”, not “pheresis” as was quite widely used at the time.

In addition to providing education in apheresis medicine for healthcare professionals, ASFA also now seeks to provide education to patients undergoing apheresis treatment.
