= Brian V. Jegasothy =

Sri Lankan dermatologist (1943–2001)

- Born: March 3, 1943
- Died: April 20, 2001 (aged 58)
- Occupation: Physician
- Years active: 31
- Known for: Dermatology
- Medical career
- Research: Immunologic Mechanisms

Brian V. Jegasothy (born March 3, 1943, in Colombo, Sri Lanka) was a dermatologist and visiting professor at over 50 Universities. and clinics, and was the Chairman of the Department of Dermatology at the University of Pittsburgh from 1987 to 1999.

Jegasothy helped develop an improved treatment for a rare kind of cancer known as cutaneous T-cell lymphoma. Jegasothy and his colleagues at Yale University established the standard photopheresis technique used to treat serious cases of cutaneous T-cell lymphoma He also aided in the study of immunobullous diseases, which is when the immune system attacks the skin and causes it to blister and fall off.

He helped in the development of a topical form of FK506, which is an anti-rejection drug invented by organ transplant researchers at Pittsburgh. Topical FK506 has been used to treat conditions such as psoriasis in addition to the rashes that transplant patients develop.

Jegasothy was also the founder of the Asian Indian Christian Church of Pittsburgh, which unites members of Pittsburgh's Indian, Sri Lankan, Pakistani and Bangladeshi communities.

== Early life and career ==
Brian V. Jegasothy was a boarder and scholar at Wesley College, Colombo. He won the Hill Medal in 1960 and obtained a direct entry to the new Medical Facility in Peradeniya. While he worked at a local bank for a short time, he met his future wife Dr. Juliet Jegasothy, medical director for hospital accreditation at the University of Pittsburgh Medical Center.

In 1961, he earned his bachelor's degree for Biology and in 1966, he earned his medical degree, both at the University of Ceylon. He also received a master's degree from University of Pennsylvania.

Brian V. Jegasothy later came to the United States to further his studies. His mentor at a New York city hospital then recommended him for a dermatology residency at Yale. From Yale, Jegasothy's career took him to Duke University, where he worked as a clinician, educator, administrator and researcher, receiving numerous grants from pharmaceutical companies, foundations, and the National Institutes of Health. He later joined the University of Pennsylvania, before he became chairman of the dermatology department at the University of Pittsburgh in 1987, a post he held until 1999.

Throughout his career Brian V. Jegasothy was a visiting professor at countless national and international universities, including Yale University, Cambridge University, and New York University. He worked on identifying a series of T-cell cytokines, documenting immunologic deficiencies in several dermatologic illnesses, evaluating extracorporeal photopheresis and pioneering the studies of oral FK506. He also served on numerous editorial boards and was a prominent participant and leader in multiple dermatological organizations.

== Professional associations ==
Brian V. Jegasothy had served in many leadership positions, including:

- Board of Directors for the Society of Investigative Dermatology, 1992–2001.
- Board of Directors for the Association of the Professors of Dermatology, 1989–2001.
- Chairman of the Scientific Program Committee for the Society of Investigative Dermatology, 1985–1990.
- Chairman of the Scientific Awards Committee for the American Academy of Dermatology, 1985–1988.
- President of the American Society for Dermatologic Allergy and Immunology, 1984.
- Examiner for the American Board of Dermatology.

== Lectures ==
Brian V Jegasothy lectured dermatologists and physicians at national conferences and clinics, including the Mayo Clinic, Mount Sinai Medical Center, the American Academy of Dermatology Annual Meeting and the American Dermatologic Association Annual Meeting. Jegasothy also lectured at prominent international conferences and universities including Cambridge University, the Indian Dermatologic Association Annual Meeting, the World Congress of Dermatology, the University of Kiel, and the Japanese Society for Investigative Dermatology.

== Publications ==
Brian V. Jegasothy was the author of several books and hundreds of scientific articles, abstracts and chapters. He has published in the JAMA Dermatology, the Journal of the American Academy of Dermatology, the Journal of Investigative Dermatology, and the New England Journal of Medicine
