= Plateletpheresis =

Method of collecting platelets from blood

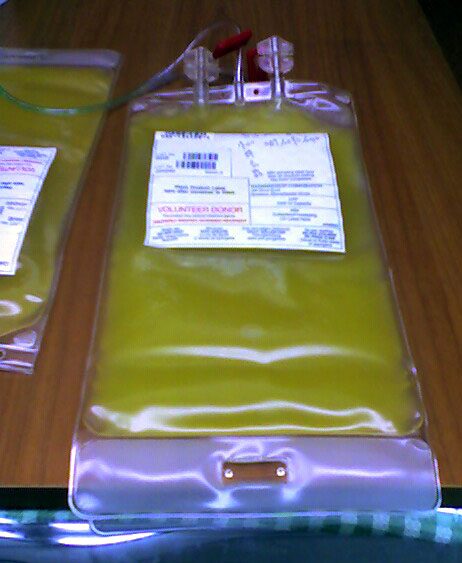
- A 250 mL bag of newly collected platelets
- ICD-10-PCS: 6A550Z2, 6A551Z2
- ICD-9-CM: 99.05
- MeSH: D010983

Plateletpheresis (more accurately called thrombocytapheresis or thrombapheresis, though these names are rarely used) is the process of collecting thrombocytes, more commonly called platelets, a component of blood involved in blood clotting. The term specifically refers to the method of collecting the platelets, which is performed by a device used in blood donation that separates the platelets and returns other portions of the blood to the donor. Platelet transfusion can be a life-saving procedure in preventing or treating serious complications from bleeding and hemorrhage in patients who have disorders manifesting as thrombocytopenia (low platelet count) or platelet dysfunction. This process may also be used therapeutically to treat disorders resulting in extraordinarily high platelet counts such as essential thrombocytosis.

== Platelet transfusion ==
Platelet transfusions are traditionally given to patients undergoing chemotherapy for leukemia, multiple myeloma, those with aplastic anemia, AIDS, hypersplenism, idiopathic thrombocytopenic purpura (ITP), sepsis, bone marrow transplant, radiation treatment, organ transplant or surgeries such as cardiopulmonary bypass. Platelet transfusions should be avoided in those with thrombotic thrombocytopenic purpura (TTP) because it can worsen neurologic symptoms and acute renal failure, presumably due to creation of new thrombi as the platelets are consumed. It should also be avoided in patients with heparin-induced thrombocytopenia (HIT) or disseminated intravascular coagulation (DIC).

In adults, platelets are recommended in those who have levels less than 10,000/μL, or less than 20,000/μL if a central venous catheter is being placed, or less than 50,000/μL if a lumbar puncture or major surgery is required.

=== Whole blood platelets ===
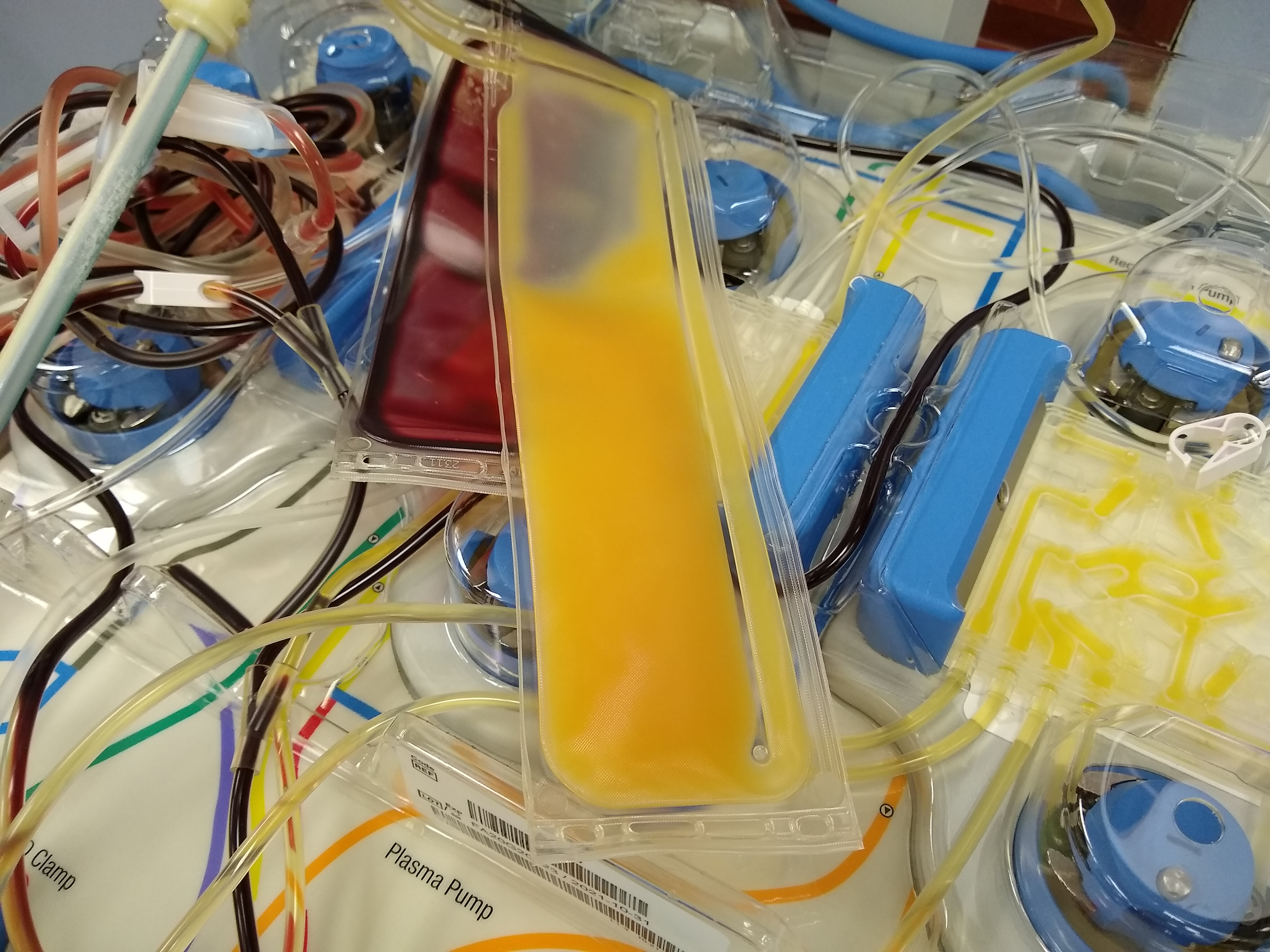
Platelets collected by using apheresis at an American Red Cross donation center

Not all platelet transfusions use platelets collected by automated apheresis. The platelets can also be separated from donations of whole blood collected in a traditional blood donation, but there are several advantages to separating the platelets at the time of collection. The first advantage is that the whole-blood platelets, sometimes called "random" platelets, from a single donation are not numerous enough for a dose to give to an adult patient. They must be pooled from several donors to create a single transfusion, and this complicates processing and increases the risk of diseases that can be spread in transfused blood, such as human immunodeficiency virus.

Collecting the platelets from a single donor also simplifies human leukocyte antigen (HLA) matching, which improves the chance of a successful transfusion. Since it is time-consuming to find compatible donors for HLA-matched transfusions, collecting a full dose from a single donor is more practical than finding multiple compatible donors.

Plateletpheresis products are also easier to test for bacterial contamination, a leading cause of transfusion-associated deaths. Pooling of whole blood platelets is often done in an "open" system where the platelet containers are connected in a way that could expose the platelets to air, and pooled platelets must be transfused promptly so that any contamination does not have time to grow.

Problems with apheresis include the expense of the equipment used for collection. Whole blood platelets also do not require any additional donor recruitment, as they can be made from blood donations that are also used for packed red blood cells and plasma components.

=== Thrombocytopenia due to underproduction ===
Recipients in this category include those undergoing chemotherapy, those with myelophthisic anemia, AIDS, or with aplastic anemia. If indicated, transfusions (one thrombapheresis concentrate) should be given until recovery of platelet function, generally approximately twice weekly. Surgical bleeding due solely to thrombocytopenia occurs when platelets < 50,000/μL while spontaneous bleeding occurs when platelets < 10,000/μL. Thrombocytopenic patients can develop "dry" bleeding, that is, petechiae and ecchymoses only. They will not suffer fatal hemorrhagic events unless they first have extensive mucosal bleeding, or "wet" bleeding. Therefore, in those with no bleeding or only "dry" bleeding, the threshold for transfusion should be between 5,000 and 10,000/μL. A more conservative threshold of 20,000/μL should be used in those with a fever or other risk factors for bleeding. Those with active bleeding or prior to surgery should have a threshold of 50,000/μL. An unconfirmed, but helpful, way to determine whether a patient is recovering from chemotherapy-induced thrombocytopenia is to measure "reticulated" platelets, or young RNA-containing platelets, which signifies that the patient is starting to make new platelets.

=== Immune thrombocytopenia ===
Recipients in this category include those with idiopathic thrombocytopenic purpura or drug-induced thrombocytopenia. Platelet transfusions are generally not recommended for this group of patients because the underlying cause involves antibodies that destroy platelets, therefore any newly transfused platelets will also be destroyed. Platelet transfusion may be used in emergency bleeding situations where the platelets could be used by the body before the immune system destroys them.

=== Altered platelet functions ===
Disorders of platelet function can be congenital or acquired. Most of these disorders are mild and may respond to therapy with desmopressin (dDAVP). Transfusion is not necessarily required. However, with some more severe disorders such as Glanzmann thrombasthenia, transfusions with large amount of platelets may be needed. The number of transfusions may be reduced if these patients are given recombinant human factor VIIa since the underlying cause are antibodies to platelet glycoproteins IIb/IIIa.

=== Cardiopulmonary bypass surgery ===
Cardiopulmonary bypass surgery can result in destruction of a large proportion of the patient's platelets and may render the remaining viable platelets dysfunctional. The indications for transfusion in such patients is controversial. General guidelines recommend not transfusing patients prophylactically but only when they are bleeding excessively, while also giving desmopressin.

=== Drug-induced platelet dysfunction ===
The most common of these is aspirin, and its similar drug class, the NSAIDs. Other anti-platelet drugs are commonly prescribed for patients with acute coronary syndromes such as clopidogrel and ticlopidine. When surgery is undertaken following the administration of these drugs, bleeding can be serious. Transfusion under these circumstances is not clear-cut and one has to use clinical judgment.

== Expected platelet increase after transfusion ==
Platelet count increase as well as platelet survival after transfusion is related to the dose of platelets infused and to the patient's body surface area (BSA). Usually these values are less than what would be expected.

- Corrected platelet count increment (CCI) = platelet increment at one hr × BSA (m^{2}) / # platelets infused × 10^{11}
- Expected platelet increase (per μL) = platelets infused × CCI / BSA (m^{2})

The theoretical value of the CCI is 20,000/μL but clinically, the value is closer to 10,000/μL. If the CCI is less than 5,000/μL, patients are said to have "refractoriness" to platelet transfusion.

== Platelet collection ==
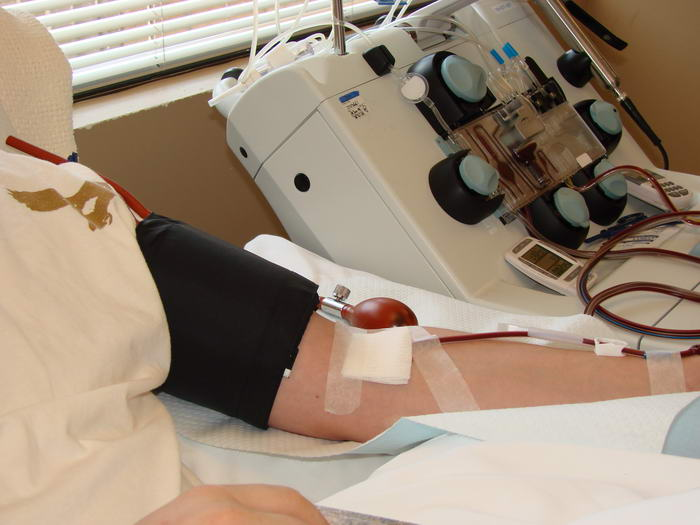
A single line cartridge based, centrifuge machine. Collecting a 'double unit' in this instance.

The separation of individual blood components is done with a specialized centrifuge (see apheresis). The earliest manual forms of thrombapheresis are done by the separation of platelets from multiple bags of whole blood collected from donors or blood sellers. Since each blood bag (usually 250 mL or 500 mL) contains a relatively small number of platelets, it can take as many as a dozen blood bags (usually from five to ten bags, depending on the size of the blood bags and each donor's platelet count) to accumulate a single unit of platelets (enough for one patient). This greatly increases the risks of the transfusion. Each unit of platelets separated from donated whole blood is called a "platelet concentrate".

Modern automatic thrombapheresis allows blood donors to give a portion of their platelets, while keeping their red blood cells and at least a portion of blood plasma. Therefore, no more than three units of platelets are generally harvested in any one sitting from a donor. Most donors will donate a "single" or "double" unit, however the occurrence of "triples" has been increasing as more suitable donors are recruited.

Because platelets have a shelf life of just five days, more platelet donors are always needed. Some centers are experimenting with seven-day platelets, but this requires additional testing and the lack of any preservative solutions means that the product is far more effective when fresh.

Even though red blood cells can also be collected in the process, many blood donation organizations do not do so because it takes much longer for the human body to replenish their loss. In addition, some (though not all) centers defer further platelet donations until the red blood cells can be replenished.

In most cases, blood plasma is returned to the donor as well. However, in locations that have plasma processing facilities, a part of the donor's plasma can also be collected in a separate blood bag (see plasmapheresis). For example, in Australia around 5.9 × 10^{11} platelets and 580 mL of plasma might be collected from an 88 kg donor.

=== Leukoreduction ===
Due to their higher relative density, white blood cells are collected as an unwanted component with the platelets. Since it takes up to 3 liters of whole blood (the amount of a dozen blood bags) to generate a dose of platelets, white blood cells from one or several donors will also be collected along with the platelets. A 70 kg (154 lb) man has only about 6 liters of blood. If all of the incidentally collected white blood cells are transfused with the platelets, substantial rejection problems can occur. Therefore, it is standard practice to filter out white blood cells before transfusion by the process of leukoreduction.

Early platelet transfusions used a filter to remove white blood cells at the time of transfusion. It takes a trained person about 10 minutes to assemble the equipment, and this is not the safest or most efficient means of filtration because living white blood cells can release cytokines during storage and dead white blood cells can break up into smaller fragments that can still stimulate a dangerous response from the immune system. In addition, simple filtration can lead to increased risks of infection and loss of valuable platelets. Newer, more advanced thrombapheresis machines can filter white blood cells during separation.

For example, with marginally acceptable whole blood (white blood cells: < 10,000/mm³; platelets: > 150,000/mm³), a dose (3 × 10^{11}) of platelets comes with about 2 × 10^{10} white blood cells. This can seriously damage the patient's health. A dose of single-donor platelets prepared using latest filters can contain as little as 5 × 10^{6} white blood cells.

=== Apheresis ===
There are two types of manual platelet apheresis. Platelet-rich plasma (PRP) is widely used in North America and buffy coat (BC) is more widely used in Europe.

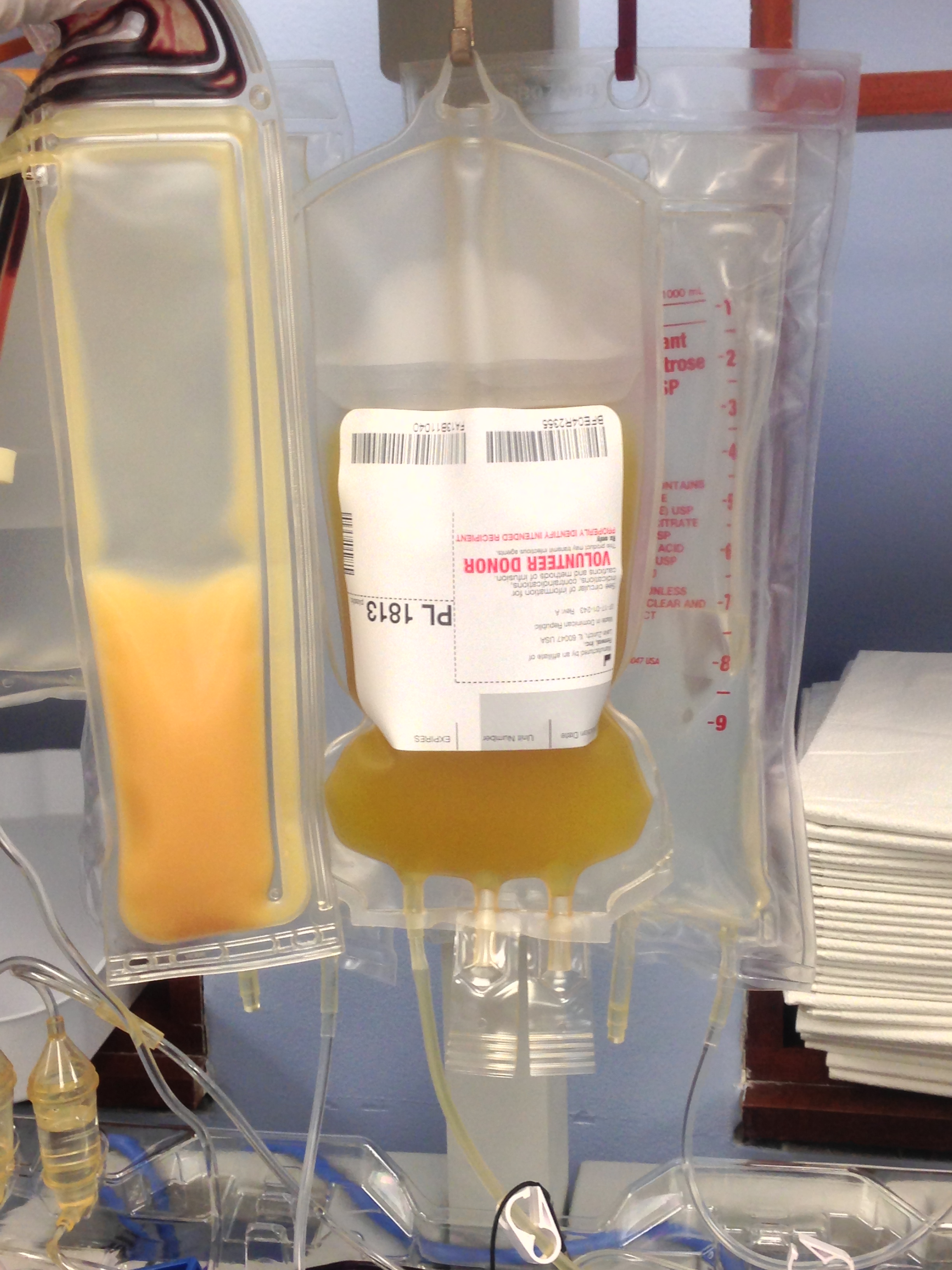
Plasma can be collected simultaneously with a platelet donation.

Platelets are the clotting cells of the blood. Platelet donation therapy is frequently needed by cancer patients, because chemotherapy for such patients can render them unable to generate platelets of their own.

The basic principles of automatic platelet apheresis are the same as in the manual procedure, but the whole procedure is performed by a computer-controlled machine. Since the donor's blood is processed in a sterile single-use centrifuge, the unwanted components can be returned to the donor safely. This allows the apheresis machine to repeat the draw-centrifuge-return cycle to obtain more platelets. The bulk of the machine and the length of the donation process means most platelet donations are done in blood centers instead of mobile blood drives.

Each country has its own rules to protect the safety of both donor and recipient. In a typical set of rules, a platelet donor must weigh at least 50 kg (110 lb) and have a platelet count of at least 150 × 10^{9}/L (150,000 platelets per mm³).

One unit has greater than 3 × 10^{11} platelets. Therefore, it takes 2 liters of blood having a platelet count of 150,000/mm³ to produce one unit of platelets. Some regular donors have higher platelet counts (over 300,000/mm³); for those donors, it only takes about one liter of their blood to produce a unit. Since the machine used to perform the procedure uses suction to draw blood out of a donor's body, some people who can give whole blood may have veins too small for platelet donation.

Blood accounts for about 8% of body weight, so a 50 kg (110 lb) donor has about four liters of blood. No more than 50% of a donor's platelets are ever extracted in one sitting, and they can be replenished by the body in about three days.

Most newer apheresis machines can separate a maximum donation of platelets in about 60 to 120 minutes depending on the donor's health condition.

== Platelet donation ==
After a short physical examination which usually involves checking the donor's height, weight, body temperature, blood pressure, pulse rate, haemoglobin concentration, etc., the donor is taken into the donation room and sits in a reclining chair next to the machine. The technician cleans one or both arms with iodine, chlorhexidine or other disinfectant, and inserts the catheter into a vein in the arm. With some procedures both arms are used, one to draw blood and the other to return it. The process takes about one to two hours while blood is pulled into the machine, mixed with an anticoagulant such as sodium citrate, spun around, and returned to the donor. "Double needle" procedures using both arms tend to be shorter since the blood is drawn and returned through different catheters; with "single needle" procedures a set volume is drawn and processed in the first part of the cycle and returned in the second part. The donor's blood undergoes repeated cycles of draw and return.

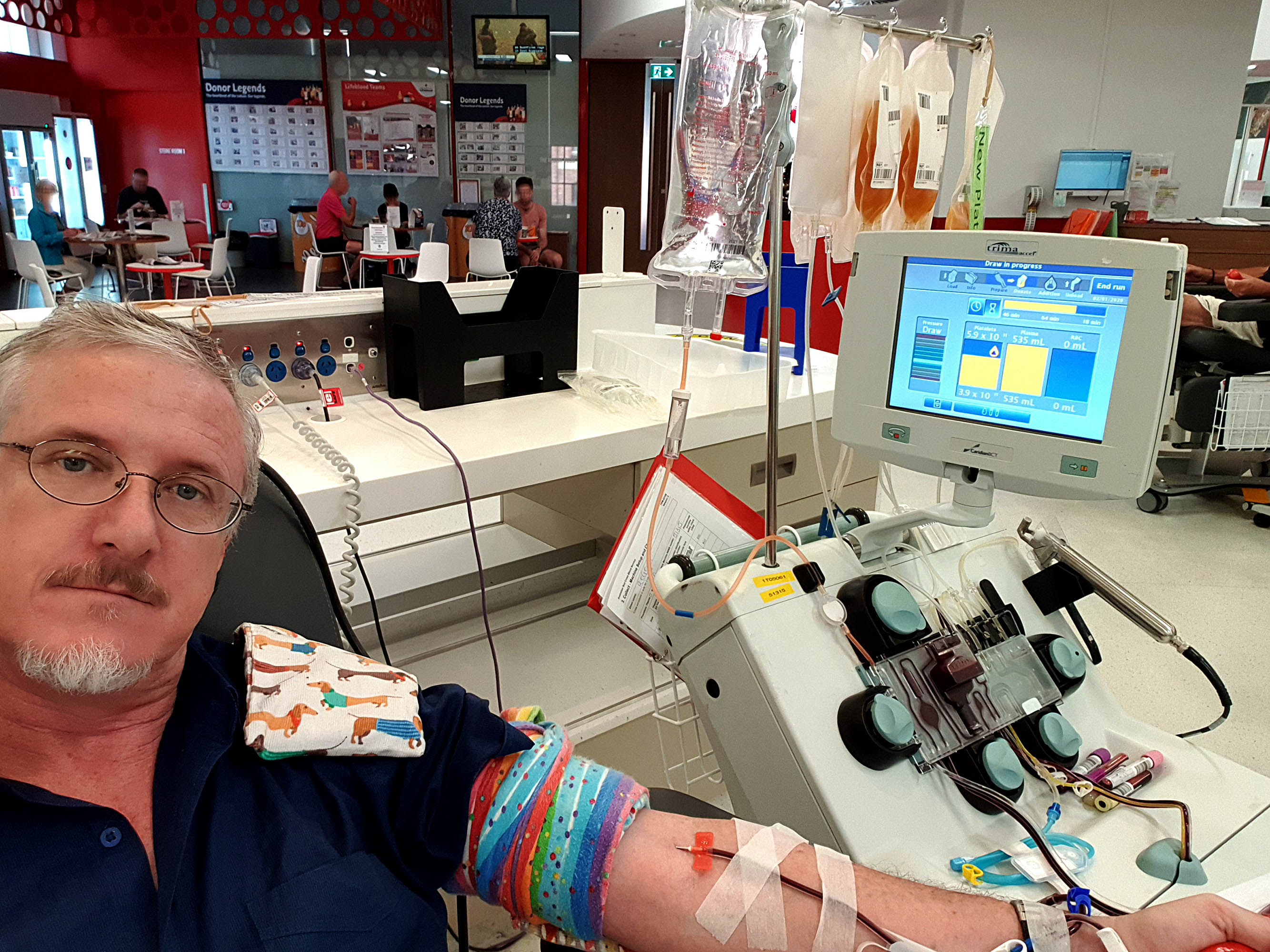
Platelet donation by a single line automatic separation and leukocyte reduction apheresis machine at an Australian donation centre in 2020

Platelet donation by a double catheter at a US donation center in 2022. Blood is drawn from the right arm, platelets are extracted using the machine, and the remaining blood components are returned through the left arm

Side effects of the donation of platelets generally fall into three categories: blood pressure changes, problems with vein access, and effects of the anticoagulant on the donor's calcium level. Blood pressure changes can sometimes cause nausea, fatigue, and dizziness. Venous access problems can cause bruising, referred to as a hematoma. While donating, a supply of calcium antacid tablets is usually kept close by to replenish the calcium lost. Because the anticoagulant works by binding to the calcium in the blood, a donor's levels of calcium – and especially of active calcium ions – drop during the donation process. The lips may begin to tingle or there may be a metallic taste; since calcium enables the function of the nervous system, nerve-ending-dense areas (such as the lips) are susceptible, at least during the donation process. Unusually low calcium can cause more serious problems such as fainting, nerve irritation and short-duration tetany. Such an acute hypocalcaemia is usually due to low calcium levels prior to donation, aggravated by the anticoagulant. Hypocalcaemia can be curtailed by modestly increasing dietary calcium intake in the days prior to donation. Serious problems are extremely rare, but apheresis donors are typically not allowed to sleep during the long donation process so that they can be monitored.

Aside from the procedure, donating platelets is different from donating blood in a few ways.

Firstly, the donor must not take aspirin or other anti-platelet medications such as clopidogrel (Plavix) for anywhere from 36 to 72 hours prior to donation (guidelines vary by blood center). (Aspirin can prevent platelets from adhering to clot bleeding.) Some blood centers also prohibit the taking of any non-steroidal anti-inflammatory drug (NSAID) for 36 hours prior.

Secondly, platelet donations are allowed anywhere from every 3 to 28 days. This is in contrast to whole-blood donation, which has an eight-week (or longer) waiting period. Along those lines, since platelet donation temporarily removes whole blood from the body, it may be necessary to wait eight weeks after a whole blood donation to donate platelets, although two weeks is more common. In the US, a donor is allowed to donate platelets every seven days, but not more than 24 times during any 365-day period and may not lose more red blood cells or plasma during that period than they would from the maximum allowable number of whole blood donations. In India, as per Ministry of Health, the blood donation interval criteria for apheresis requires at least 48 hours interval after platelet- or plasma-apheresis. Any donation should not be done more than two times a week and should be limited to 24 times in one year.

Thirdly, additional tests may be required before becoming a donor for the first time. These tests may establish a platelet count. Newer automated platelet pheresis machines do that as the donation begins, and adjust accordingly the quantity of platelets to be drawn. Tests may also determine the donor's compatibility with particular recipients through a human leukocyte antigen (HLA) test. Multiparous women may be excluded from becoming donors due to heightened TRALI risk. These tests usually involve nothing more involved than the drawing of several tubes of blood.

=== Adverse events ===
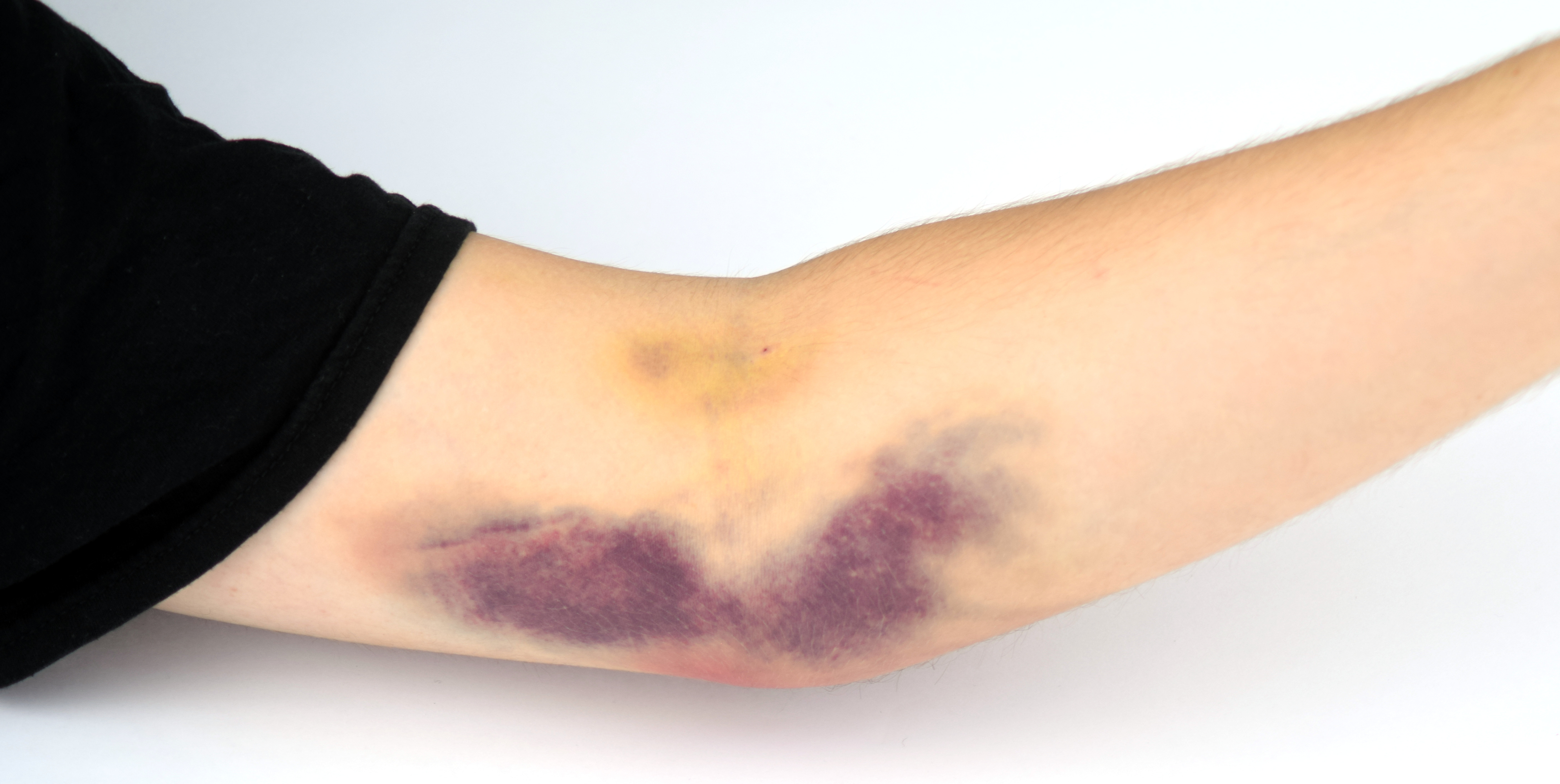
A hematoma caused by a dislodged needle during a plateletpheresis donation

Adverse conditions that can happen during a plateletpheresis donation are hypocalcemia, hematoma formation, and vasovagal reactions. The risk of these conditions is normally reduced by pre-donation education of the donors and change of apheresis machine configuration.

==== Vein scarring ====
Repeated platelet donations at short intervals will cause the venipuncture site to scar. While cosmetically it is virtually invisible, the scarring also occurs on the vein itself, making it harder to insert a needle on future occasions. Anecdotal reports have said that rubbing vitamin E oil (or the insides of a vitamin E capsule) on the venipuncture site may reduce scarring. However, a study conducted by the University of Miami Department of Dermatology and Cutaneous Surgery in 1999 demonstrated no positive effect from the application of topical vitamin E.

== See also ==
- Blood transfusion
