= Nehal =

Given name in India

- Gender: unisex
- Language: Sanskrit; Arabic

Origin
- Origin: India
- Meaning: Rainy, Beautiful, Spring
- Region of origin: India, Bangladesh, Sri Lanka, Turkey, Iran, Pakistan,

Other names
- Related names: Nahla, Nihal, Nina, Neha

Nehal (Sanskrit: नेहल, pronounced næhāl, Persian: نهال, pronounced næhāl) is a South Asian and Middle Eastern name derived from Sanskrit meaning "intelligent" or "born at a time of intelligence".

The name also has Persian roots, meaning "newly planted tree," metaphorically referring to attributes of beauty and youth.

The name has a variety of meanings in other languages, such as "rainy," "loving," "intelligent," "genius," "spring," and "beautiful." In Arabic, Nehal is a collective word describing water from springs, essentially meaning "source of life"; as a name, it symbolises the will to drink from the source of knowledge and therefore means "eager to acquire knowledge". In Punjabi, Nehal means "joy" or "happy". In Sanskrit, Nehal means "born during the period of intelligence".

Notable individuals with the name include:

- Nehal Bibodi, Indian-Ugandan cricketer
- Nehal Wadhera, Indian cricketer
- Nehal Chudasama, Indian model
- Nehal Hashmi, Pakistani lawyer and politician
- Nehal N. Mehta, American cardiologist
- Nehal Saafan, Egyptian synchronized swimmer
