= Granulocyte transfusion =

Transfusion of white blood cells

A granulocyte transfusion is a medical procedure in which granulocytes are infused into a person's blood. Granulocytes are a category of white blood cell that includes neutrophils, eosinophils, and basophils. Granulocyte transfusions were historically used to prevent and treat infections in people with neutropenia (an abnormally low level of neutrophils), but the practice declined in popularity in the 1980s. Interest in the procedure increased in the 1990s due to the development of more effective methods for harvesting granulocytes and a growing population of people with severe neutropenia from chemotherapy. However, the treatment's efficacy remains poorly understood and its use is controversial.

Granulocytes are most often collected through leukapheresis, a process that separates the donor's white blood cells from their red blood cells and plasma. Donors may be given corticosteroids or granulocyte colony-stimulating factor to increase their granulocyte count prior to the blood collection. Granulocytes have a short shelf life and it is recommended that they are transfused within hours of collection. Adverse effects from granulocyte transfusions include fever, chills, respiratory symptoms, transfusion-transmitted infections, and the development of antibodies against human leukocyte antigens, which can interfere with subsequent transfusions.

== Medical uses ==
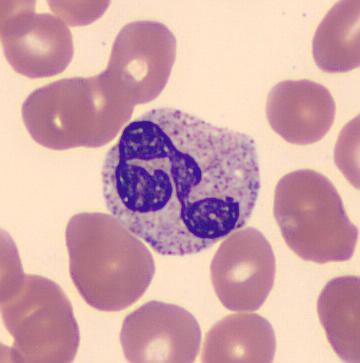
A neutrophil seen in a blood smear

Neutrophils are the most common type of granulocyte in normal blood, and they play a major role in defending against infections, especially those caused by fungi and bacteria. People with severe neutropenia, a low neutrophil count, have an increased risk of developing serious infections. One of the approaches to preventing and treating infections in people with neutropenia is to increase the neutrophil count, which is commonly done using drugs like G-CSF to stimulate the production of neutrophils in the bone marrow. However, another approach is to directly transfuse granulocytes from a donor into the person's blood.

As of 2015, there is some evidence that granulocyte transfusions may help to prevent bacteremia and fungemia in adults who have neutropenia caused by chemotherapy or hematopoietic stem cell transplantation. However, it is unclear whether this has any impact on mortality or major adverse events, and the use of granulocyte transfusions to prevent infections is considered controversial because of the potential for serious side effects. Although the studies performed to date have been low-quality, a 2016 review suggested that granulocyte transfusion may not be effective for treating infections in adults with neutropenia. In both cases, the treatment is considered investigational.

Granulocyte transfusion is still used in some cases, such as in cases of severe neutropenia and where the patient has a life-threatening infection that does not respond to antimicrobial treatment. The treatment has also been studied in people with aplastic anemia (a condition in which a person's bone marrow does not produce enough blood cells) and chronic granulomatous disease (a disorder in which a person has a normal number of neutrophils, but they do not function correctly). Newborn babies who have neutropenia and sepsis are sometimes given granulocyte transfusions, although a 2011 study found that there was insufficient evidence to determine whether or not this practice is effective.

== Donation ==
Prior to donating granulocytes, potential donors must undergo screening and testing procedures. They are required to meet the general criteria for blood donation. Because the granulocyte concentrate also contains red blood cells, the donor's ABO blood type is usually matched to the recipient's. (Note: If an ABO-compatible donor cannot be found, then the unit of granulocytes can undergo further processing (before being administered to the patient) in order to remove red blood cells.) If the recipient has antibodies against human leukocyte antigens (HLA), proteins found on the surface of white blood cells, the donor's cells need to be tested for compatibility, because antibodies against donor granulocytes can reduce the effectiveness of the transfusion and cause transfusion reactions.

In order to collect enough granulocytes for the transfusion to be effective, donors are frequently given drugs to increase their neutrophil count prior to the blood collection. The treatment typically includes corticosteroids or G-CSF, often in combination. Donors may experience minor side effects from steroid and G-CSF treatment, including headaches, bone and joint pain, insomnia and fatigue.

The donor blood undergoes leukapheresis, a process by which white blood cells are separated from red blood cells and plasma. During the blood collection, the donor's blood is mixed with hydroxyethyl starch, which helps separate the granulocytes from other blood components during sample processing. The other components of the blood are returned to the donor's circulation. The process of collecting the granulocytes takes about four to five hours. Because a large amount of blood (seven to ten litres) is processed during apheresis, donors may experience adverse effects from changes in fluid balance. An alternative approach, more commonly used in the United Kingdom, is to combine the buffy coats (the fraction of blood containing white blood cells) from multiple routine blood donations to create a blood product containing a high amount of granulocytes.

Once collected, granulocytes have a 24-hour shelf life. It is recommended that they are transfused within a few hours of collection. They cannot be frozen, as this severely inhibits the cells' functions. The white blood cell concentrate obtained through leukapheresis contains a high number of active T lymphocytes, which can cause graft-versus-host disease in the recipient, so it is often exposed to radiation to inactivate these cells.

== Risks ==
Adverse effects are more common with granulocyte transfusions than with red blood cell transfusions. 25 to 50 percent of people who receive granulocyte transfusions experience mild to moderate side effects, while 1 percent experience severe complications. Fever and chills are common side effects. Granulocyte transfusions may affect the lungs, causing cough, difficulty breathing, low oxygen levels, and abnormal chest X-rays. These lung complications may potentially be fatal. A review paper found that the frequency of lung-related side effects ranged from 0 to 53 percent.

On rare occasions, recipients can develop transfusion-transmitted diseases if pathogens are present in the donor blood. This is a particular problem with granulocyte transfusions because of their short shelf life, which means they must be transfused before infectious disease testing is complete. Infection with cytomegalovirus (CMV) is a concern, as this virus is found in white blood cells, so if the recipient is at risk of developing severe disease from CMV, it is recommended that granulocytes be collected from a CMV-negative donor.

If the donor white blood cells are not irradiated, the recipient may be at risk of developing graft-versus-host disease. Finally, people who receive granulocyte transfusions may develop antibodies against the human leukocyte antigens found on the surface of white blood cells, which can predispose them to transfusion reactions, decrease the lifespan of donor white blood cells in their circulation, and reduce the efficacy of platelet transfusions and allogeneic stem cell transplants.

== History ==
In a 1934 experiment, Strumia gave neutropenic patients intramuscular injections of neutrophils, but this proved ineffective in improving their neutrophil function. In 1953, Brecher et al. demonstrated the principle behind granulocyte transfusion by infusing neutrophils into dogs and showing that they travelled to sites of inflammation. The first human granulocyte transfusions were carried out in the 1960s, using white blood cells harvested from people with chronic myeloid leukemia and concentrated using centrifugation. Steroid treatment and leukapheresis were later introduced, allowing granulocytes to be collected from healthy donors. However, these techniques were not very effective as they did not produce a high granulocyte count. Owing to poor efficacy, an undesirable side effect profile, and the impracticality of storing granulocytes for an extended period of time, the use of granulocyte transfusions declined. Improvements in antimicrobial therapy and supportive care also played a role in the treatment's decreasing popularity. However, the introduction of donor treatment with G-CSF in the 1990s allowed high numbers of granulocytes to be collected from healthy donors. This, combined with an increasing number of people with severe neutropenia as a result of chemotherapy and the growing prevalence of multidrug resistant infections, led to a renewal of interest in granulocyte transfusions.
