= RBC exchange =

RBC exchange may refer to:

- The Royal Bank of Canada currency exchange
- Erythrocytapheresis, red blood cell exchange
