= ASFA =

ASFA may refer to:

- Adoption and Safe Families Act
- Alabama School of Fine Arts
- American Samoa Football Association
- American Sighthound Field Association
- American Society for Apheresis
- Anuncio de Señales y Frenado Automático, Spanish train protection system
- Aquatic Sciences and Fisheries Abstracts
- Aramean Syriac Football Association
- ASFA Soccer League
- ASFA Yennega
- Association of Science Fiction and Fantasy Artists
- Association of Special Fares Agents
- As-Sunnah Foundation of America
- Athens School of Fine Arts
- Abryanz Style and Fashion Awards (ASFAs)

Asfa may refer to:

- Asfa Wossen
