= Neha =

Female given name

- Gender: Female
- Language: Hindi; Sanskrit

Origin
- Origin: India
- Meaning: love
- Region of origin: India

Other names
- Related names: Nehal, Nahla, Nina

Neha (Hindi and Sanskrit: नेहा; Hindi pronunciation: [neː.ɦɑː]) is a popular Hindi/ Sanskrit Indian feminine given name, often found in the Hindu community. It means 'love' / 'affection', 'rain' / 'downpour', and is sometimes translated as 'beautiful eyes'.

== Etymology ==
The name Neha has multiple origins. It may mean one of the following:

- 'love' or 'affection', when derived from Sneha (Sanskrit: स्नेह);
- 'rain' or 'downpour', when derived from Nehal (Sanskrit: नेहल); or
- 'beautiful eyes', when referencing common beliefs across Indian baby naming sites.

== Notable people named Neha ==
- Neha Ratish (born in december 17, 2014),Indian artist
- Neha Ahuja (born September 27, 1981), Indian alpine skier.
- Neha Joshi, (born 7 December 1986), Indian actress.
- Neha Bamb (born May 9, 1985), Indian actress.
- Neha Bhasin (born November 18, 1982), Indian musician and presenter.
- Neha Devi Singh (born August 9, 1981), Indian actress and writer.
- Neha Dhupia (born August 27, 1980), Indian actress and model.
- Neha Hinge (born 1986), Indian actress, model and software engineer.
- Neha Janpandit (born June 8, 1988), Indian actress.
- Neha Jhulka (born 1984), Indian actress.
- Neha Kakkar (born June 6, 1988), Indian singer.
- Neha Kapur (born 1984), Indian actress, model and winner of the 2006 Femina Miss India pageant.
- Neha Lakshmi Iyer (born 1990), Indian actress.
- Neha Mankani, Pakistani midwife
- Neha Marda (born September 23, 1985), Indian actress and model.
- Neha Mehta (born June 9, 1988), Indian actress.
- Neha Nair (born September 14, 1989), Indian composer and singer.
- Neha Narang (born August 4, 1987), Indian actress.
- Neha Oberoi (born September 15, 1980), Indian actress.
- Neha Pendse (born November 29, 1984), Indian actress.
- Neha Rajpal (born June 23, 1978), Indian anchor, composer, producer and singer.
- Neha Ratnakaran (born March 24, 1997), Indian actress and model.
- Shabana Raza (born April 18, 1975), Indian actress.
- Neha Saxena (born 1989), Indian film actress.
- Neha Sharad (born October 6, 1992), Indian actress and poet.
- Neha Sharma (born November 21, 1987), Indian actress and model.
- Neha Sharma (cricketer) (born June 9, 1988), Emirati cricketer.
- Neha Shetty, Indian actress
- Neha Sillay (born May 19, 2006), Indian footballer.
- Neha Tanwar (born August 11, 1986), Indian cricketer.
