= Blood-spinning =

Medical procedure

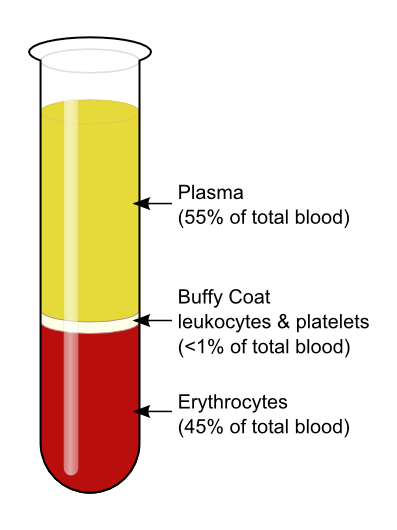
When the tube of blood is removed from the centrifuge, the components have separated into three layers: blood serum, the buffy coat containing platelet cells, and red blood cells.

Blood-spinning is a medical procedure used to shorten the healing time of an injury. Small samples of the patient's blood are taken and spun in a centrifuge, allowing platelets and blood serum to be isolated from other blood components. The platelets and plasma are then combined forming platelet-rich plasma (PRP), which has high concentrations of natural growth factors. The PRP sample can then be injected into the patient's injury, which may help reduce pain and improve recovery speeds.

== Use in professional sports ==
This procedure has been deemed controversial at times, especially when used by athletes. In 2005, the World Anti-Doping Agency ruled that blood-spinning could be used to introduce banned substances, and in 2010 the agency went as far as banning the use of intramuscular injections of PRP in competitive athletes amid some concerns that it boosted performance-enhancing growth factors. However, that ban was lifted the following year, after it was concluded that there was a "lack of any current evidence concerning the use of these methods for purposes of performance enhancement". There is some debate about the effectiveness of the procedure on improving healing times, with some doctors suggesting the evidence is inconclusive or contentious.

Numerous professional athletes in a variety of sports have used blood-spinning to help recover from injuries, including professional tennis player Rafael Nadal, professional golfer Tiger Woods, and former NFL player Hines Ward. The practice is allowed by FIFA and has been used in the UK at Tottenham Hotspur, and at Chelsea during José Mourinho's managerial stint at the club.
