= Pediatric apheresis =

Medical treatment

Pediatric apheresis is the pediatric use of apheresis, a treatment modality that processes whole blood through medical technologies for the purpose of separating it into components and removing identified pathological, cellular, or plasma components. Apheresis technology and equipment is used to perform both adult apheresis and pediatric apheresis. However, pediatric patients require advance monitoring and clinical accommodations (due to their smaller body mass and immature body system functions) to safely perform treatments. Pediatric therapeutic apheresis treatments include plasma exchange, red cell exchange/depletion, stem cell collections, leukodepletion, and plasma exchange with a secondary plasma device.

== Pediatric Consideration in Apheresis ==
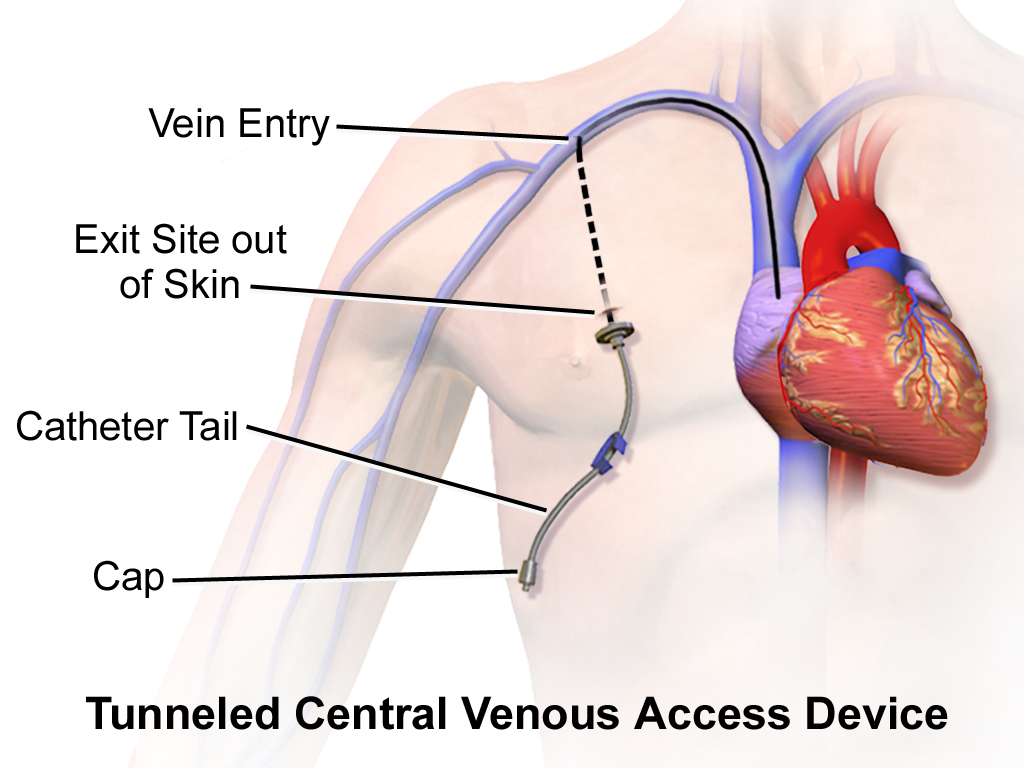
Central venous access used for apheresis.

Central venous access is required to perform apheresis treatments, which usually use central venous catheter devices. The flow through a central venous catheter accommodates high blood flows (ml_{s}/min) to achieve blood separation and remove the appropriate isolated blood component. Pediatric considerations for central venous access include (but are not limited to) size of veins, size of catheter for insertion, maturity of pediatric patient, and the duration of treatment chronic (> 1 year) or acute (1–10 days).

Apheresis must not exceed a safe extracorporeal volume of blood outside of the body at any given time, especially for children below 25 kg. Priming the circuit prior to treatments reduces the adverse effects associated with hypovolemia caused by the apheresis. Blood products used to minimize this adverse effect are red cells, reconstituted blood, and 5% Albumin. The use of each blood product is dependent on the clinical considerations for the pediatric patient, but in all cases the prime serves to reduce the hypovolemic effects the large extracorporeal volume of blood places on low weight children. Listed below are blood products used to prime the circuit for pediatric apheresis:

- Red cells: Concentrated red cells
  - Replaces the prime volume in the apheresis circuit with red cells.
  - Reduces risk for anemia (see adverse events)
- Reconstituted whole blood: Diluted whole blood with either saline or plasma to a hematocrit equal to patient's own hematocrit.
  - Replaces the prime volume in the apheresis circuit with reconstituted whole blood.
  - Reduces risk for anemia (see adverse events)
- 5% Albumin: Isotonic solutions
  - Replaces the prime volume in the circuit with 5% albumin.
  - Reduces risk of hypotension related to hypovolemia.

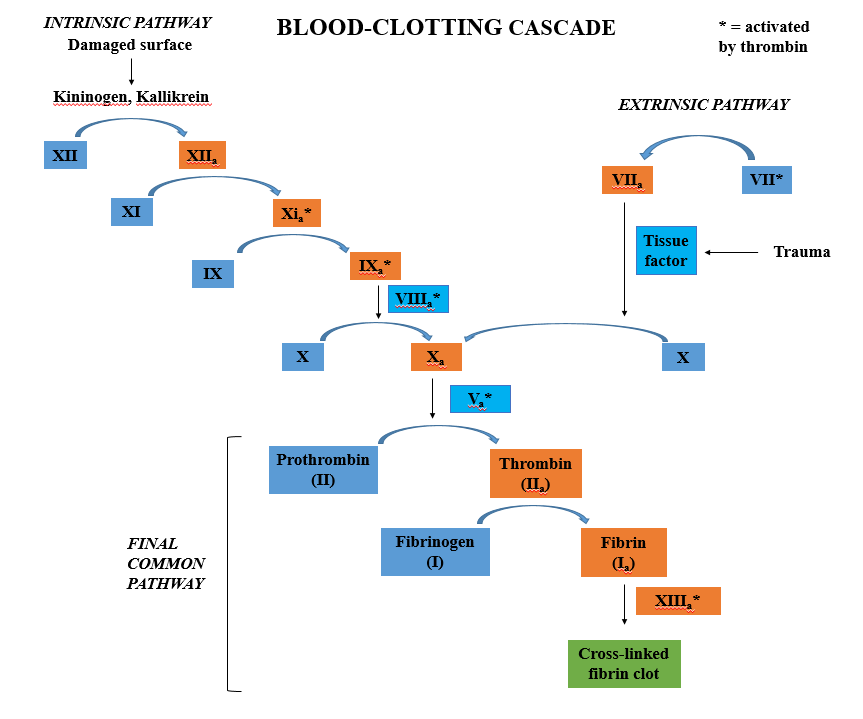
Clotting cascade. Ionized calciums role in clotting.

Electrolyte imbalances: There are large volumes of separated blood components being exchanged during an apheresis treatment, this can create electrolyte imbalances when combined with citrate as the circuit anticoagulant. Electrolyte imbalances can include (but not limited to) Hypokalemia, hypocalcemia hypomagnesemia and elevated total carbon dioxide. When citrate is used as regional anticoagulant in pediatric apheresis treatments, it binds to free floating calcium (ionized) to disrupt the clotting cascade (see image) leading to hypocalcemia. In the same process it chelates magnesium and can cause hypomagnesemia. The by-product of metabolizing citrate elevates carbon dioxide levels in the blood that can lead to metabolic acidosis. Potassium is a plasma-bound electrolyte, and in large volumes of plasma exchange and replacement of a isotonic solution (5% albumin) can induce hypokalemia. Reducing the effects these electrolyte imbalances can have on a pediatric patient receiving apheresis treatments can include: establishing acceptable blood levels prior to the start of treatment (which can vary across institutions), pre blood electrolyte levels outside of this established parameter are corrected to within normal limits before treatment is initiated. If the child is symptomatic then electrolyte management and replacement is required according to institution policy.

Monitoring patients: Pediatric patients undergoing apheresis treatments require ongoing monitoring in relation to the electrolyte imbalances noted, and the risk of hypotension related to the large extra-corporeal volume. This includes cardiac monitoring and close clinical observation for signs and symptoms related to adverse events (see below) by the bedside nurse, caregiver and healthcare team. Close monitoring of the patient subverts the escalation of symptoms, especially for young non-verbal children.

Psychosocial considerations: Children and infants can become anxious prior to and during treatments. Reducing their fears through therapeutic play, to explain the procedure and process, can alleviate some of that anxiety. The cognitive development of the child is considered when implementing measures to reduce anxiety and to ensure that they are also age appropriate.

== Adverse Events in Pediatric Apheresis ==
During apheresis treatments, adverse events such as anemia, citrate toxicity, central venous catheter safety and infections are notable.

Anemia: Anemia is related to numerous and/or consecutive treatments and/or large extracorporeal circuits that reduces the hemoglobin levels in pediatric patients. Hemoglobin is responsible for oxygen transport in the blood.

Pediatric considerations to reduce incidence of anemia:

- Close monitoring of hemoglobin levels.
- Circuit primed with red cells or reconstituted whole blood.

Citrate Toxicity: Experienced when ionized calcium levels are low due to citrate anticoagulation which binds to free calcium in the blood, resulting in hypocalcemia.

Pediatric considerations to reduce incidence of citrate toxicity:

- Infusion of intravenous calcium during treatment.
- Adequate blood ionized calcium levels prior to treatment.

Central venous catheter infections and safety: Central venous access used for treatments are at risk for central venous catheter acquired bloodstream infections. Additionally, children are at a higher risk of dislodging indwelling central venous catheters.

Pediatric consideration to reduce incidence of central line infection and dislodgement:

- Appropriate size and type of catheter for treatment based on child's size of veins, size of catheter for insertion, maturity of pediatric patient and the duration of treatment chronic (> 1 year) or acute (1–10 days).
- Surveillance of the central venous catheter access and insertion site to note early on signs of infection or dislodgement.
- Regular central venous catheter care involves changing the dressing, placing a securement device or dressing to prevent line pulling, and changing the central line cap (if used) to prevent fluid accumulation at the central venous catheter's entry point.

== See also ==
- Apheresis
- Pediatrics
