= Joel Gelfand =

American dermatologist

Academic background
- Education: BS, Tufts University; MD, Harvard Medical School; MSCE, University of Pennsylvania

Joel M. Gelfand is an American dermatologist and epidemiologist at the University of Pennsylvania in Philadelphia, Pennsylvania. He currently serves as the James J. Leyden Professor in Clinical Investigation, the Vice Chair of Clinical Research, the director of the Psoriasis and Phototherapy Treatment Center, and the medical director of the Clinical Studies Unit in the Department of Dermatology at the Perelman School of Medicine at the University of Pennsylvania. He studies systemic comorbidities of psoriasis and much of his research has centered on the connection between cardiovascular disease and psoriasis.

== Early life and education ==
Gelfand graduated with a bachelor's degree in biology at Tufts University, and with an MD degree from Harvard Medical School. He completed a residency in dermatology and received a Master's of Science in Clinical Epidemiology at the University of Pennsylvania. He also completed a predoctoral research fellowship in Dr. Mark Lebwohl's lab and a postdoctoral research fellowship in epidemiology at dermatologist Dr. David Margolis's lab.

== Career ==
In 2003, Gelfand joined the faculty at the Perelman School of Medicine at the University of Pennsylvania. In his early career, Gelfand published on the higher rate of cardiovascular events in patients with psoriasis in a database of United Kingdom medical records. In 2006, he published a landmark paper demonstrating that psoriasis is associated with an increased risk of myocardial infarction independent of traditional risk factors. He trained cardiologist Dr. Nehal N. Mehta to study the connection between psoriasis and cardiovascular disease, and the two have collaborated extensively on subsequent research.

Gelfand has published over 330 research articles with over 33,000 citations (h-index 92) and is one of the most highly cited researchers in dermatology. His research focuses on the epidemiology of psoriasis and psoriatic arthritis, the impact of psoriasis on quality of life, and the risk of co-morbidities such as obesity, diabetes, hyperlipidemia, liver disease, kidney disease, cardiovascular events, and mortality associated with psoriasis. Notably, his research has analyzed the epidemiology of palmoplantar pustulosis and generalized pustular psoriasis in the US population, the epidemiology of psoriatic arthritis in the US population, and the prevalence of psoriasis in African Americans. He has run numerous clinical trials, most recently including a trial on the effect of psoriasis medication apremilast on cardiovascular markers including aortic vascular inflammation using techniques pioneered with Abass Alavi, a trial on patient-centered outcomes in phototherapy comparing home-based phototherapy to office-based phototherapy, and a trial of a novel care coordination model to improve cardiovascular risk prevention in psoriasis patients. He is funded by the NIH, PCORI, and the National Psoriasis Foundation amongst others.

Gelfand has also served as part of the editorial board of the Journal of the American Academy of Dermatology, Pharmacoepidemiology and Drug Safety, and Journal of Investigative Dermatology, and as the Chief Medical Editor of Healio Psoriatic Disease.

In 2021, he was named the tenured James J. Leyden Professor at the University of Pennsylvania.

== Honors and awards ==
- 2011: American Skin Association's Psoriasis Achievement Award
- 2011: Marjorie Bowman New Investigator Award, University of Pennsylvania
- 2013: Elected member of American Society for Clinical Investigation
- 2017: Marion Sulzlberger MD Memorial Award and Lectureship, American Academy of Dermatology
- 2017: National Psoriasis Foundation – Outstanding Scientific Achievement Award
- 2019: Lady Barbara Colyton's Award for autoimmune research, University of Pennsylvania
- 2022: Founders Award – American Dermatoepidemiology Network
- 2023: American College of Epidemiology Outstanding Contributions Award
