= Photopheresis =

- ICD-10-PCS: 6A650ZZ (Note: ICD10 Procedure code: this was assigned based on cross-walking from the ICD9 code at ICD10DAta.com)
- ICD-9: 99.88
- MeSH: D017893

In medicine, photopheresis (aka extracorporeal photopheresis or ECP) is a form of apheresis and photodynamic therapy in which blood is subject to apheresis to separate buffy coat (WBC + platelets) from whole blood, chemically treated with 8-methoxypsoralen (instilled into a collection bag or given per os in advance), exposed to ultraviolet light (UVA), and then returned to the patient. Activated 8-methoxypsoralen crosslinks DNA in exposed cells, ultimately resulting apoptosis of nucleated cells. The photochemically damaged T-cells returned to the patient appear to induce cytotoxic effects on T-cell formation. The mechanism of such "antitumor" action has not been elucidated.

A 1987 New England Journal of Medicine publication introduced photopheresis involving 8-methoxypsoralen., now standard U.S. Food and Drug Administration (FDA) therapy for cutaneous T-cell lymphoma. Evidence suggests that this treatment might help treat graft-versus-host disease, though this evidence is largely observational; controlled trials are needed to support this use. Photopheresis has also been successful in treating epidermolysis bullosa acquisita when all other treatments have been ineffective.

Minimal observed side effects for patients receiving photopheresis include hypotension and syncope resulting from volume shifts during leukapheresis phase of treatment. Photopheresis is also an experimental treatment for patients with cardiac, pulmonary and renal allograft rejection, graft-versus-host disease, autoimmune diseases, nephrogenic systemic fibrosis and ulcerative colitis.

== See also ==
- Blood irradiation therapy
