= LDL apheresis =

Medical procedure to remove LDL in blood

- Specialty: Hematology

In medicine, LDL apheresis is a form of apheresis, resembling dialysis, to eliminate the cholesterol-containing particle low-density lipoprotein (LDL) from the bloodstream.

== Uses ==
It is used in diseases featuring high LDL, such as the rare homozygous familial hypercholesterolemia, when the heterozygous form does not respond to medical treatment, or when the treatment has led to dangerous side-effects (such as rhabdomyolysis).

The procedure takes 2–4 hours and must be repeated every several weeks to keep the LDL levels from accumulation and causing cardiovascular disease.

It is an expensive procedure, limiting its use to severe cases of hyperlipidemia.

== Principles ==
LDL apheresis works by leading venous blood through a column containing beads coated with antibodies to apolipoprotein B (the main protein of LDL particles), dextran sulfate cellulose beads, modified polyacrylate beads, or by precipitating LDL with heparin at low pH, double membrane filtration or immunoadsorption utilizing Lp(a)-specific antibodies. In all cases (apart from polyacrylate absorption), plasma is separated from cells by a cell separator.
