= Nehal N. Mehta =

American cardiologist

- Born: November 30, 1975 (age 50); Mumbai, India
- Education: George Washington University School of Medicine; University of Pennsylvania; Oxford University; George Washington University

Nehal N. Mehta, (born November 30, 1975) is an American cardiologist at the National Heart, Lung, and Blood Institute (NHLBI) in Bethesda, Maryland where he studies the role of innate immunity and inflammation in the development of cardiovascular and metabolic diseases.

He is the first Lasker Clinical Research Scholar Awardee at the National Institutes of Health (NIH), and is presently the head of the Laboratory of Inflammation and Cardiometabolic Disease at NHLBI, and Lasker Senior Investigator at NIH.

== Education and early career ==
Mehta was born in Mumbai; as a one-year-old, he moved to the United States. Mehta attended the George Washington University's 7-year biomedical program and received his Bachelor of Arts in 1997 with Honors and Doctor of Medicine degree in 2001 with Distinction from the George Washington University School of Medicine & Health Sciences. He spent time in 1997 studying Biochemistry at Oxford University, United Kingdom before starting medical school.

He then completed a residency in internal medicine, fellowship in cardiovascular diseases, nuclear cardiology, and a post-doctoral fellowship in genetic epidemiology at the Hospital of the University of Pennsylvania where he joined in 2007 as the director of the Inflammatory Risk in Preventive Cardiology. Initially, Mehta focused on the role of inflammation in obesity and performed studies demonstrating that acute inflammation led to adipose inflammation. Then in 2009, he extended these findings by collaborating with Dr. Joel Gelfand to understand why psoriasis, an inflammatory skin disease increased risk for heart attack. To characterize this link, Mehta received the first Lasker Clinical Scholar Award which moved his program from the University of Pennsylvania to the NIH. In 2012, the Albert and Mary Lasker Foundation and the NIH named him the inaugural Lasker Investigator, enabling Mehta to create a laboratory focusing on the role of inflammation in cardiometabolic diseases at the NIH.

== Career ==
Following epidemiological observations of accelerated heart attack risk in psoriasis, Mehta's research program has spent the past decade dissecting why this may occur. Prior work demonstrated that both aortic vascular inflammation and coronary artery plaque occur about a decade earlier in psoriasis compared to non-psoriasis. Furthermore, cholesterol transport is dysfunctional which in the face of systemic inflammation and immune dysregulation drives early cholesterol crystal formation. His work has focused on trying to elucidate whether treatment of the skin disease in psoriasis can reverse vascular diseases. His most recent discovery that "treatment with systemic anti-inflammatory medications improve lipid-rich coronary plaque in inflammatory diseases such as psoriasis" earned him both an NIH Director's Awards and an NHLBI Orloff Science Award.

== Honors and awards ==
- 2000: William Beaumont Research Honors Society, The George Washington University
- 2006: Merck Award for Metabolic Syndrome Research/American College of Cardiology
- 2010: Jeremiah Stammler Research Award, Northwestern University Young Investigators Symposium
- 2012: Lasker Clinical Research Scholar Award, NHLBI, NIH
- 2014: NHLBI Director's Award: Outstanding Clinical Research
- 2017: NHLBI Director's Award: Outstanding Clinical Research
- 2018: NHLBI Orloff Science Award: Inflammation and Atherosclerosis
- 2018: American Society for Clinical Investigation
- 2018: NIH Director's Award: Science/Medical Award
- 2020: AFMR's 2020 Outstanding Investigator Award

Mehta has been a visiting professor at many medical and research institutes around the world.

== Notable publications ==
1. Elnabawi YA,...Mehta NN. Association of Biologic Therapy With Coronary Inflammation in Patients With Psoriasis as Assessed by Perivascular Fat Attenuation Index. JAMA Cardiol. 2019 Jul 31. doi: 10.1001/jamacardio.2019.2589. [Epub ahead of print] PubMed PMID 31365032.
2. Gelfand JM,...Mehta NN. A Phase IV, Randomized, Double-Blind, Placebo-Controlled Crossover Study of the Effects of Ustekinumab on Vascular Inflammation in Psoriasis (the VIP-U Trial). J Invest Dermatol. 2020 Jan;140(1):85-93.e2. doi: 10.1016/j.jid.2019.07.679. Epub 2019 Jul 19. PubMed PMID 31326395.
3. Elnabawi YA,...Mehta NN. Coronary artery plaque characteristics and treatment with biologic therapy in severe psoriasis: results from a prospective observational study. Cardiovasc Res. 2019 Mar 15;115(4):721-728. doi: 10.1093/cvr/cvz009. PubMed PMID 30721933.
4. Mehta NN, Shin DB, Joshi AA, et al. Effect of 2 Psoriasis Treatments on Vascular Inflammation and Novel Inflammatory Cardiovascular Biomarkers: A Randomized Placebo-Controlled Trial. Circ Cardiovasc Imaging. 2018;11(6):e007394. doi:10.1161/CIRCIMAGING.117.007394. PubMed PMID 29776990
5. Sajja AP,...Mehta NN. Potential Immunological Links Between Psoriasis and Cardiovascular Disease. Front Immunol. 2018;9:1234. Published 2018 Jun 1. doi:10.3389/fimmu.2018.01234. PubMed PMID 29910818
6. Baumer Y,...Mehta NN. Chronic skin inflammation accelerates macrophage cholesterol crystal formation and atherosclerosis. JCI Insight. 2018;3(1):e97179. Published 2018 Jan 11. doi:10.1172/jci.insight.97179. PubMed PMID 29321372
7. Mehta NN, Teague HL, Swindell WR, et al. IFN-γ and TNF-α synergism may provide a link between psoriasis and inflammatory atherogenesis. Sci Rep. 2017;7(1):13831. Published 2017 Oct 23. doi:10.1038/s41598-017-14365-1. PubMed PMID 29062018
8. Lerman JB,...Mehta NN. Coronary Plaque Characterization in Psoriasis Reveals High-Risk Features That Improve After Treatment in a Prospective Observational Study. Circulation. 2017;136(3):263‐276. doi:10.1161/CIRCULATIONAHA.116.026859. PubMed PMID 28483812
