= Rheopheresis =

Rheopheresis is a process to change the viscosity of blood by filtering blood to remove some components such as fibrinogen, alpha-2-macroglobulin, von Willebrand factor, LDL cholesterol and immunoglobulin M.

It is an experimental treatment for dry age-related macular degeneration, and acute ischemic stroke.
