= Leukapheresis =

Procedure separating white blood cells from blood

- ICD-10-PCS: 6A550Z1, 6A551Z1
- MeSH: D007937
- OPS-301 code: 8-802

Leukapheresis (/ˌluˈkʌfɜːriːsɪs/) is a laboratory procedure in which white blood cells are separated from a sample of blood. It is a specific type of apheresis, the more general term for separating out one particular constituent of blood and returning the remainder to the circulation.

Leukapheresis may be performed to decrease a very high white blood cell count, to obtain blood cells from a patient (autologous) or donor (allogeneic) for later transplant into the patient, or to obtain cells for research purposes.

In the case of hematological malignancies such as chronic leukemias, white blood cell counts may be high enough to cause leukostasis and "sludging" in the capillaries (acute leukemias have a more variable white cell count whereas chronic cases typically have higher white cell counts). This can affect retinal vasculature leading to vision changes, pulmonary vasculature leading to shortness of breath from decreased efficiency in oxygen exchange, as well as other organ systems such as the brain which would become clinically apparent with neurological deterioration of a patient from cerebrovascular compromise.

Leukapheresis may be performed to obtain the patient's own blood cells for a later transplant. White blood cells may be removed to protect them from damage before high-dose chemotherapy, then transfused back into the patient, in the treatment of advanced breast cancer. Another novel use of cells obtained through leukapheresis is to stimulate a patient’s immune system to target prostate cancer cells.

Alternatively, only granulocytes, macrophages and monocytes may be removed, leaving the lymphocyte count largely unchanged. This is used as a treatment for autoimmune diseases such as ulcerative colitis and rheumatoid arthritis, where these cells play an active part in the inflammation process.

Leukapheresis, typically for granulocytes, is a rarely performed blood donation process. The product is collected by automated apheresis and is used for systemic infections in patients with neutropenia. The donor is typically a blood relative who has received stimulating medications (a directed donation), and the product is irradiated to prevent GVHD. The product generally has a 24-hour shelf life from collection and is often transfused before infectious disease testing is completed. It is a therapy of last resort, and its use is controversial and rare.

Leukapheresis is used in evolving CAR-T cell therapy to obtain leukocytes from a cancer patient or donor which can be modified and given to the patient as a therapeutic dose.

== Etymology ==
The word leukapheresis (/ˌluːkəfəˈriːsɪs/) uses combining forms of leuk- + apheresis, although it quite plausibly could be parsed as leuko- + pheresis, as both of those forms are accepted alternate forms (leuk-/leuko-; apheresis/pheresis). The latter parsing explains why people often spell the word with an -o- as *leukopheresis; nonetheless, no professionally curated dictionaries as of 2016 enter that spelling, and it is traditionally treated as a misspelling by medical style guides that mention it.
