= Leukostasis =

Human disease

Leukostasis (also called symptomatic hyperleukocytosis) is a medical emergency most commonly seen in patients with acute myeloid leukemia. It is characterized by an extremely elevated blast cell count and symptoms of decreased tissue perfusion. The pathophysiology of leukostasis is not well understood, but inadequate delivery of oxygen to the body's cells is the result. Leukostasis is diagnosed when white cell plugs are seen in the microvasculature. The most common symptoms are dyspnea and hypoxia, usually accompanied by visual changes, headaches, dizziness, confusion, somnolence, and coma. Prompt treatment is required since, if left untreated, it has a very high mortality rate. Treatments aim to rapidly reduce white blood cell counts while also treating the underlying disorder.

== Overview ==
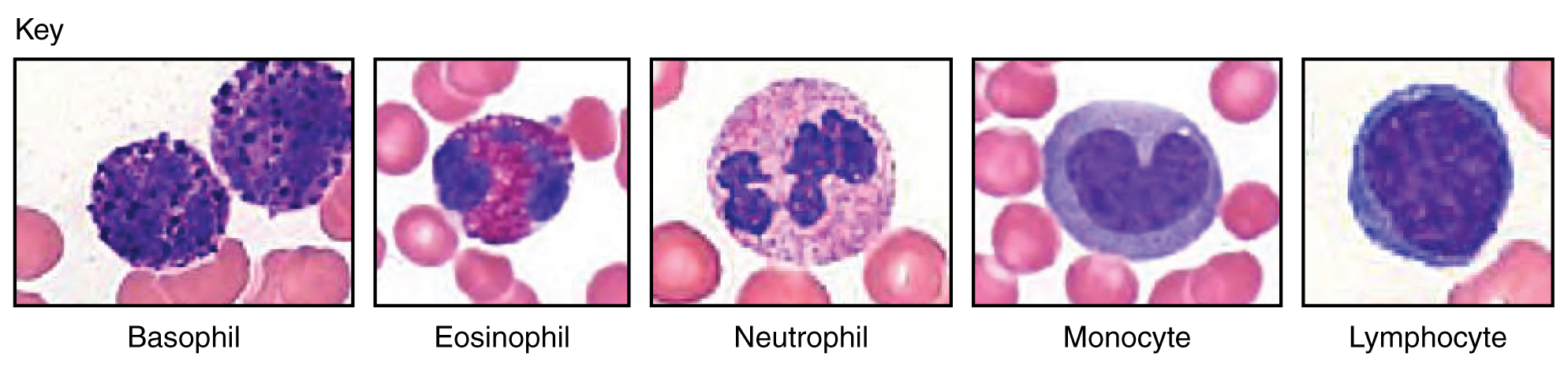
Leukocytes

Symptomatic hyperleukocytosis (leukostasis) is defined by a high blast cell count along with symptoms of decreased tissue perfusion. Leukostasis is associated with people who have bone and blood disorders and is very common among people with acute and chronic myeloid leukemia. Leukostasis is a pathologic diagnosis that inhibits efficient flow to the microvasculature of the body. Continued and untreated leukostasis presents respiratory and neurological distress simultaneously and is a medical emergency, with mortality rates reaching between 20 and 40 percent when untreated. A leukemia blood cell count greater than 50×10^{9}/L or 100×10^{9}/L signifies hyperleukocytosis. Above 100×10^{9}/L, symptoms of leukostasis start.

== Signs and symptoms ==
Individuals affected by leukostasis may present with respiratory symptoms such as cough, difficulty breathing, breathing too quickly, or inadequate levels of oxygen in the blood requiring support with a mechanical ventilator. Neurologic symptoms, such as temporary confusion, blurry vision, dizziness, ringing in the ears, ataxia, stupor, sleepiness, headaches, and coma, may be seen. Neurologic signs such as seizures, focal neurologic deficits (e.g., weakness in one arm or leg), swelling of the retina, retinal bleeding, and dilated blood vessels on inspection of the back of the eye. Rare complications of leukostasis include renal vein thrombosis, priapism, and acute ischemia of the leg.

The most common symptom is fever, which is often linked with inflammation and possible infection. Less common symptoms include myocardial ischemia or right ventricular overload, increased acute kidney injury, priapism, acute limb ischemia and bowel infarction.

In symptomatic leukocytosis caused by leukemia, it is common to find leukostasis in all their organs. The majority of the time, patients die from neurological complications (roughly 40%) instead of particular organ damage. The lungs alone account for approximately 30 percent of the deaths. All other organs combined attribute to 30 percent, with the major outliers being neurological and respiratory failure equating to 70 percent. Damage to the microvasculature of the body is the primary cause of death. Microvasculature damage to the lungs is second only to neurological damage because the body is already experiencing hypoxic conditions, which leads to lung tissue damage.

== Causes ==
Causes of leukocytosis
Neutrophilic leukocytosis (neutrophilia)	Acute bacterial infections, especially pyogenic infections; Sterile inflammation; Tissue necrosis; Myocardial infarction; Burns
Eosinophilic leukocytosis (eosinophilia)	Allergic disorders; Asthma; Hay fever; Drug allergies; Allergic skin diseases; Pemphigus; Dermatitis herpetiformis; Parasitic infections; Some forms of malignancy; Hodgkin's lymphoma; Some forms of non-Hodgkin lymphoma; Systemic autoimmune diseases (e.g. SLE); Some forms of vasculitis; Cholesterol embolism (transiently)
Basophilic leukocytosis (basophilia)	(rare): Myeloproliferative disease (e.g. chronic myelogenous leukemia)
Monocytosis	Chronic infections; Tuberculosis; Bacterial endocarditis; Rickettsiosis; Malaria; Systemic autoimmune diseases (e.g. SLE); Inflammatory bowel diseases (e.g. ulcerative colitis)
Lymphocytosis	Chronic infections; Tuberculosis; Brucellosis; Viral infections; Hepatitis; Cytomegalovirus infections; Infectious mononucleosis; Pertussis; Some forms of malignancy, such as lymphocytic leukemias

Hyperleukocytosis is very common in acutely ill patients. It occurs in response to a wide variety of conditions, including viral, bacterial, fungal, or parasitic infections, cancers, hemorrhages, and exposure to certain medications.

For lung diseases such as pneumonia and tuberculosis, where leukocytosis is usually present, white blood cell count can aid diagnosis.

Specific medications, including corticosteroids, lithium and beta agonists can cause hyperleukocytosis.

== Pathophysiology ==
The pathophysiology of leukostasis is not well understood. Inadequate delivery of oxygen to the body's cells (hypoxia) is thought to be the main abnormal result of leukostasis. Proposed mechanisms for this include increased blood viscosity due to the high number of white blood cells circulating in the blood and a higher proportion of cells with a greater mean corpuscular volume (larger cells) with decreased deformability occupying the blood vessels. However, certain studies have demonstrated that the blood viscosity of affected individuals is not increased due to a compensatory decrease in the number of red blood cells sometimes resulting in anemia and a decreased hematocrit.

The mechanism in which hyperleukocytosis or leukostasis manifests and disrupts homeostasis is greatly associated with leukemia's but multiple other factors may cause leukocytosis. Major types of leukocytosis and their mechanisms depend on the types of leukemia that cause them. White blood cell levels either rise in distinct white blood levels or in unison with others, a patient may have neutrophilia, lymphocytosis, monocytosis, eosinophilia, basophilia or a rise in immature blast cells.

A number of diseases present with hyperleukocytosis as a symptom:

- Acute myeloid leukemia – 10 to 20 percent of patients newly diagnosed with this type leukemia have hyperleukocytosis.
- Acute lymphoblastic leukemia – 20 to 30 percent of patients newly diagnosed with this type of leukemia have hyperleukocytosis.
- Chronic lymphocytic leukemia – The exact percentage of people diagnosed with chronic lymphocytic leukemia is unknown but a significant number also have hyperleukocytosis.
- Chronic myeloid leukemia – The majority of patients with chronic myeloid leukemia usually have hyperleukocytosis.

== Diagnosis ==
The clinical signs and symptoms of leukostasis are non-specific but should be suspected in susceptible individuals with leukemia, a high white blood cell count (e.g., over 100,000), and new-onset neurologic or respiratory signs or symptoms. Rales may be heard when listening to the lungs with a stethoscope.

White blood counts exceeding 100×10^{9}/L present symptoms of tissue hypoxia and may signal possible neurological and respiratory distress. Research from 2017 has shown that patients have experienced hypoxia at leukocyte levels below 100×10^{9}/L. Because of this, patients with leukemia need regular neurological and respiratory monitoring when leukocyte counts are approaching 100×10^{9}/L to decrease chances of tissue hypoxia.

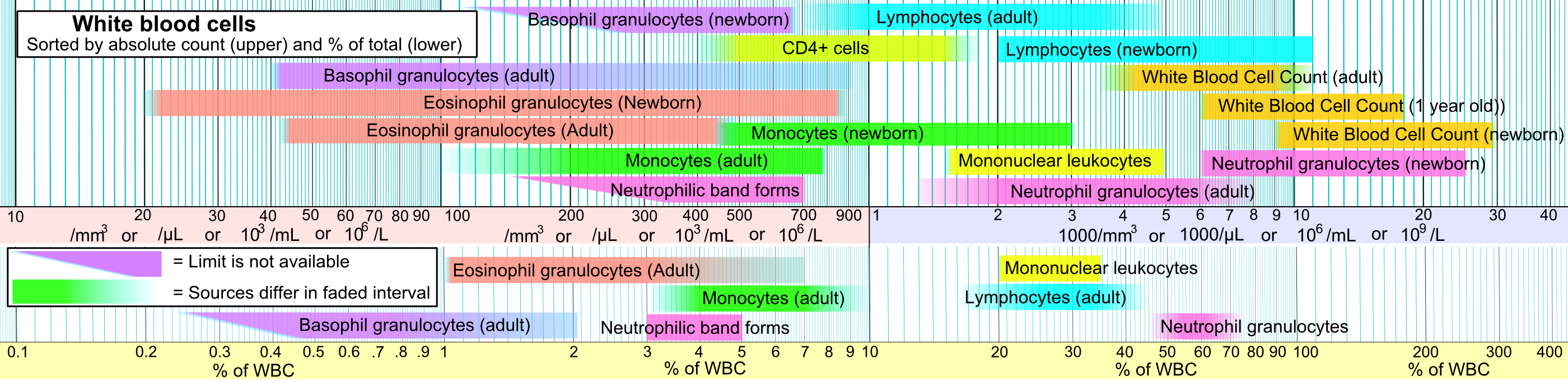

Acquired biopsies are examined for damage to microvasculature, which serves as evidence of hypoxia through the identification of leukocyte blockage within the tissue. Due to the invasive nature of and risks associated with biopsies, biopsies are only done when deemed necessary.

A chest x-ray can be normal in those with leukostasis or may demonstrate an alveolar pattern of infiltrates. Brain imaging with computed tomography (CT) or magnetic resonance imaging (MRI) is useful and can demonstrate areas of bleeding, ischemic stroke, or masses.

Measurements for arterial pO2 have shown to be falsely decreased in patients with hyperleukocytosis because of white blood cells' ability to utilize oxygen. Pulse oximetry should be used to more accurately assess pO2 levels of a patient suspected to have leukocytosis. Automated blood cell counters may be inaccurate due to fragments of blast cells being labeled on blood smears as platelets. The most accurate form of confirming platelet counts is by using a manual platelet count and a review of a peripheral smear. Since serum potassium levels may also be artificially elevated by a release from leukemic blasts during in vitro clotting processes, serum potassium levels should be monitored by heparinized (the addition of heparin prevents coagulation) plasma samples in order to obtain accurate results of potassium levels. Disseminated intravascular coagulation may occur in a significant number of patients with presentation of various degrees of thrombin generation, followed by decreased fibrinogen and increased fibrinolysis.

Spontaneous tumor lysis syndrome is present in approximately 10 percent of patients with leukostasis. Laboratory abnormalities seen in those with leukostasis include a markedly elevated white blood cell count (hyperleukocytosis) and electrolyte abnormalities seen with tumor lysis syndrome such as high concentrations of potassium, phosphorus, and uric acid in the blood and a low level of calcium in the blood (due to being bound by high amounts of circulating phosphorus).

Disseminated intravascular coagulationand spontaneous tumor lysis syndrome can develop before and after chemotherapy treatment. Patients undergoing this type of therapy need to be closely monitored before and after, in addition to undergoing prophylactic measures to prevent possible complications.

== Prevention ==
Since leukostasis and hyperleukostasis are associated with leukemia, preventive treatments are taken upon diagnosis.

Patients with hyperleukocytosis associated with leukemia are always considered candidates for tumor lysis syndrome prophylaxis in addition to aggressive intravenous hydration with allopurinol or rasburicase to decrease serum uric acid levels.

== Treatment ==
Treatment includes utilization of prophylactic methods if the patient has been diagnosed with hyperleukocytosis. This is usually in combination with other treatments, which are dependent on the type of leukemia. Specific treatments include lysis syndrome treatment in addition to aggressive intravenous hydration with allopurinol or rasburicase to decrease serum uric acid levels.

Hematopoietic cell transplants are critical to correct leukostasis and leukemia. Cytoreduction is also a critical course of treatment in order to rapidly decrease white blood cell counts. Twenty to forty percent of patients diagnosed with hyperleukocytosis die within the first week of symptom presentation. Patients with the best outcome have none or limited symptoms of respiratory or neurological distress. An accumulation of these symptoms lead to decreased levels of statistical survival compared to patients diagnosed with asymptomatic hyperleukocytosis alone. Cytoreduction methods include chemotherapy, utilizing the drug hydroxyurea (usually used in asymptomatic hyperleukocytosis), and the less common leukapheresis procedure. This procedure is often utilized for asymptomatic hyperleukocytosis patients who have induction chemotherapy postponed for patient-specific factors.

Variants of chemotherapy, including induction chemotherapy, are used to treat both elevated white blood cells counts while simultaneously targeting leukemia cells in the bone marrow.

== Prognosis ==
Leukostasis is a high-risk condition and can lead to significant complications resulting from occlusion of blood vessels, including transient ischemic attacks and strokes.

Prognosis of patients with hyperleukocytosis is dependent on the cause and type of leukemia the patient has. Patients diagnosed with asymptomatic hyperleukocytosis have significantly better survival rates than symptomatic hyperleukocytosis (leukostasis). Preventative measures and contentious monitoring of patients diagnosed with leukemia is critical in receiving treatment as early as possible to prevent and treat hyperleukocytosis.

== Recent research ==
Recent research as of 2017 has shown that patients have had hypoxia at leukocyte levels below 100×10^{9}/L, therefore patients with leukemia need regular neurological and respiratory monitoring when leukocyte counts are approaching 100×10^{9}/L to decrease the chances of hypoxia.

Leukemia and population types are also believed to be associated with possible symptoms and may require a change in treatment.

Results of tumor lysis and consumption of coagulopathy in patients with acute leukemia is much more often than in patients with chronic malignant hematological diseases.

Leukostasis, also known as symptomatic hyperleukocytosis, is a life-threatening complication of various leukemias, characterized by an excess of white blood cells in the bloodstream. Hyperleukocytosis is arbitrarily defined as greater than 100,000 white blood cells per microliter of blood. The condition is characterized by abnormal aggregation and clumping of white blood cells in the blood vessels resulting in impaired blood flow and delivery of oxygen to the body's cells. The brain and lungs are the two most commonly affected organs. Leukostasis most commonly occurs with acute myeloid leukemia.

Hyperleukocytosis and leukostasis occur more commonly and at lower white blood cell counts in acute myeloid leukemia than in acute lymphocytic leukemia because the cells of acute myeloid leukemia have a larger corpuscular (cell) volume than those of acute lymphocytic leukemia and the cells of acute myeloid leukemia have more surface adhesion molecules than those of acute lymphocytic leukemia. In other words, the cancer cells in AML are "stickier".

== Management ==
It is an acute syndrome requiring aggressive cytoreductive modalities, including chemotherapy or leukapheresis to both reduce the number of circulating leukocytes and to break apart any aggregates that have already formed. Such rapid and massive lysis of tissue poses a risk of complications (tumor lysis syndrome), but it is necessary to avoid a stroke.

Leukostasis is different from leukemic infiltration, which is a neoplastic process where leukemic cells invade organs.

== Epidemiology ==
The incidence and prevalence of hyperleukocytosis and leukostasis vary depending on the form of leukemia. Hyperleukocytosis is common in chronic myelogenous leukemia and chronic lymphocytic leukemia, but leukostasis rarely occurs. Similarly, the incidence of hyperleukocytosis in people with acute lymphoblastic leukemia is between 10–30% but rarely does this progress to symptomatic leukostasis. The incidence of hyperleukocytosis in acute myeloid leukemia (AML) ranges between 5–20% but leukostasis is less common than hyperleukocytosis in this population; leukostasis tends to occur more often in people with AML with monocytic features.
