= Panel-reactive antibody =

Measure of the percentage of human antibodies in a transplant candidate's blood

A panel-reactive antibody (PRA) is a group of antibodies in a test serum that are reactive against any of several known specific antigens in a panel of test leukocytes or purified HLA antigens from cells. It is an immunologic metric routinely performed by clinical laboratories on the blood of people awaiting organ transplantation.

Traditionally serum is exposed to panel lymphocytes and to an extent other leukocytes in a complement dependent cytotoxicity test. From the extent and pattern of cytotoxicity an estimation of what percentage of the possible donor population the patient has antibodies against is calculated. The PRA score is expressed as a percentage representing the proportion of the population to which the person being tested will react via pre-existing antibodies against human cell surface antigens, which include HLA and other polymorphic antigen systems. It is a test of the degree of alloimmunity in a graft recipient and thus a test that quantifies the risk of transplant rejection. Each population has a different demographic prevalence of particular antigens, so the PRA test panel constituents differ from country to country.

Since late 1990's, a purified HLA antigen panel affixed to latex beads coated in fluorochrome, a kind of so called solid phase assay, has been used to replace or complement the cell based assay. This test will miss non-HLA antibodies as well as antibodies directed against HLA not included in the assay, but removes the need for panel cells.

A high PRA value usually means that the individual is primed to react immunologically against a large proportion of the population. Individuals with a high PRA value are often termed "sensitized", which indicates that they have been exposed to "foreign" (or "non-self") proteins in the past and have developed antibodies to them. These antibodies typically develop following previous transplants, blood transfusions and pregnancy. Transplanting organs into recipients with preformed antibodies may significantly increase the risk of organ rejection.

Extensive efforts have been made to identify treatment regimes to reduce PRA in sensitized transplant candidates. In certain circumstances, plasma exchange, intravenous immunoglobulin, rituximab and other "antibody-directed" immune therapies may be employed, but this is an area in which active investigation continues.
