= ABO-incompatible transplantation =

Method of allocation in organ transplantation

ABO-incompatible (ABOi) transplantation is a method of allocation in organ transplantation that permits more efficient use of available organs regardless of ABO blood type, which would otherwise be unavailable due to hyperacute rejection. Primarily in use in infants and young toddlers, research is ongoing to allow for increased use of this capability in adult transplants. Normal ABO-compatibility rules may be observed for all recipients. This means that anyone may receive a transplant of a type-O organ, and consequently, type-O recipients are one of the biggest beneficiaries of ABO-incompatible transplants. While focus has been on infant heart transplants, the principles generally apply to other forms of solid organ transplantation.

== ABO-incompatible transplantation in young children ==
Because very young children (generally under 12 months, but often as old as 24 months) do not have a well-developed immune system, it is possible for them to receive organs from otherwise incompatible donors. This is known as ABO-incompatible (ABOi) transplantation. During the initial study period of 1996–2001, allowing for ABOi heart transplantation reduced infant mortality from 58% to 7%. Graft survival and patient mortality is approximately the same between ABOi and ABOc recipients. This was found to not only allow for better allocation of organs among donors, but improved graft ischemia by reducing the time required to transport organs to prospective patients. Children are more likely to be listed for ABOi transplantation if they are UNOS status 1A (i.e. the most critical category.)

The most important factors are that the recipient not have produced isohemagglutinins, and that they have low levels of T cell-independent antigens. Studies have shown that the period under which a recipient may undergo ABOi transplantation may be prolonged by exposure to nonself A and B antigens. Furthermore, should the recipient (for example, type B-positive with a type AB-positive graft) require eventual retransplantation, the recipient may be medically capable of receiving a new organ of either blood type.

In the United States, UNOS policies allow for ABOi transplantation in children under two years of age if isohemagglutinin titers are 1:4 or below, and if there is no matching ABO-compatible (ABOc) recipient, UNOS is considering relaxation of the infant heart transplantation policy such that ABO matching is not a consideration for children under 1 year of age, and if titers are 1:16 or below for children up to age 2. Canadian centers have a heart transplantation policy matching the proposed policy in the United States.

Intentional ABOi heart transplantation in infants was conceived in the 1960s by Adrian Kantrowitz, with clinical evidence first being shown by Leonard L. Bailey's team in the mid-1980s, which he termed "immunologic privilege." It was first conducted in practice in 1996 by a team led by Dr. Lori J. West at the Hospital for Sick Children in Toronto, and published in a seminal 2001 study. In the United Kingdom, policy since 2000 is that ABOi heart transplantation is de rigueur for infants, and is considered for children under age 4, though proactive measures are often taken to lower titer levels.

== ABO-incompatible transplantation in older children and adults ==
Limited success has been achieved in ABOi heart transplantation in adults, though this requires that the adult recipients have low levels of anti-A or anti-B antibodies. Some organs are more conducive to adult ABOi transplant than others, such as the liver and kidneys. Adults are significantly likely to suffer from hyperacute rejection, thrombosis, or death, but could be considered to be an acceptable risk if the alternative is death. In the case of ABOi renal transplantation, aggressive antibody removal is required, along with supplemental medication, with the resulting condition being termed "accommodation." While such recipients are more likely to require re-transplantation early on, long-term graft survival is similar to recipients who receive ABOc kidneys.
