= Nahla Summers =

British adventurer and author

- Education: University of Leeds
- Occupations: Author, social campaigner
- Website: www.nahlasummers.com

Nahla Summers is an author and social campaigner. She has undertaken distance cycling and walking challenges to encourage acts of kindness between strangers.

In 2014 Summers founded a social enterprise called Sunshine People which aims to encourage acts of kindness. She also runs an enterprise called A Culture of Kindness which aims to improve business practices.

In 2018, Summers cycled 3015 miles from San Diego, California to San Augustine, Texas. In 2020, she cycled 5007 miles over four months on an ElliptiGO bicycle, writing a Strava art across England in the form of the word "kindness".

== Honours ==
- Awarded with a Point of Light by the Prime Minister Theresa May in 2018.
- Finalist in the 0-£10.000 category of the Charity Film Awards in 2019 for Sunshine People.
- Gold winner in the 0-£10.000 category of the Charity Film Awards in 2020 for We are Sunshine People.

== Bibliography ==
- Summers, Nahla; DL, Pinky Lilani CBE (28 August 2019). A Culture of Kindness: For the leaders of the future. ISBN 978-1086023664.
