= Nahla (name) =

Female given name

- Gender: Female

Origin
- Origin: Arabic

Other names
- Related names: Nala

Nahla is a feminine given name of Arabic origin.

The name is of Arabic origin meaning "first drink of water" or "water in the desert", there's also Nahla valley in Iraq. Additionally, the latinized term Nahla can also refer to honeybee in Arabic.

A descendant of the Arabic, "Naħla" means Bee in the Maltese language.

Another variant is Nala. This means 'gift' in Swahili.

Notable people with the given name, or its variants, include:

- Nahlah Ayed, Palestinian-Canadian journalist
- Nahla Chahal, Iraqi-Lebanese journalist and activist
- Nala Damajanti, snake charmer
- Nahla Mahmoud, Sudanese-British writer and activist
- Nahla El Fatiha Naili, Algerian sculptor
- Nahla Ramadan, Egyptian weightlifter
- Nahla Hussain al-Shaly, Iraqi women's rights promoter
- Nahla Summers, social campaigner

Notable people with the surname include:

- June-Rose Nala, South African trade unionist and academic
