= Transfusion–transmitted infection =

Pathogen that is transmitted through blood transfusion

A transfusion–transmitted infection (TTI) or transfusion–associated infection is a pathogen which is transmissible through donated blood and can give rise to infection in the recipient by way of transfusion. The term is usually limited to known pathogens, but also sometimes includes agents such as simian foamy virus which are not known to cause disease.

Following a number of highly publicized incidents throughout the 1970s-1980s, preventing disease transmission through blood donation is addressed through a series of safeguards. Blood safety measures that limit this risk of disease transmission through blood donation are considered essential in upholding public trust in blood donation, and to avoid harm to blood recipients who are frequently vulnerable to severe disease. The World Health Organization recommends screening potential blood donors for signs and symptoms of disease and for activities that might put them at risk for infection, including mandatory testing of donated blood for relevant pathogens prior to transmission, sometimes with several different methodologies. Additional safeguards, such as leukoreduction and pathogen inactivation can be applied, and are frequently mandatory. If a local supply is not safe, select blood may be imported from other areas.

Common pathogens assessed for are: Human immunodeficiency virus (HIV) which leads to the most well-known of the transfusion transmitted diseases, acquired immune deficiency syndrome (AIDS); Hepatitis B; Hepatitis C; syphilis; West Nile Virus, and dengue virus. Blood that is processed into medications by fractionation is frequently further tested and treated.

== Viruses ==
Many of these viruses are controlled through laboratory screening tests. These fall into three basic varieties: antibody tests, nucleic acid tests (NAT), and surrogate tests. Antibody tests look for the immune system's response to the infection. Nucleic acid tests look for the genetic material of the virus itself. The third variety are tests that are not specific to the disease but look for other related conditions.

High risk activities for transfusion transmitted infections vary, and the amount of caution used for screening donors varies based on how dangerous the disease is. Most of the viral diseases are spread by either sexual contact or by contact with blood, usually either drug use, accidental needle injuries among health care workers, unsterilized tattoo and body piercing equipment, or through a blood transfusion or transplant. Other vectors exist.

Whether a donor is considered to be at "too high" of a risk for a disease to be allowed to donate is sometimes controversial, especially for sexual contact. High risk sexual activity usually includes Prostitution for money or drugs, men who have sex with men, the most controversial criterion, a recent history of sexually transmitted infection, and sex with a person who has had a positive test or was at high risk for a disease.

=== HIV ===
HIV, the virus that causes AIDS, is the most well-known of the transmitted infections because of high-profile cases such as Ryan White, a haemophiliac who was infected through factor VIII, a blood-derived medicine used to treat the disease. Another person who died of medically acquired HIV/AIDS was Damon Courtenay, who died in 1991 due to a bad batch of factor VIII. The standard test for HIV is an enzyme immunoassay test that reacts with antibodies to the virus. This test has a window period where a person will be infected but not yet have an immune response. Other tests are used to look for donors during this period, specifically the p24 antigen test and nucleic acid testing.

In addition to the general risk criteria for viruses, blood donors are sometimes excluded if they have lived in certain parts of Africa where subtypes of HIV that are not reliably detected on some tests are found, specifically HIV group O. People who have been in prison for extended periods are also excluded for HIV risk.

=== Hepatitis A ===
Hepatitis A is not considered a major concern, viremic donors are often ill, with usually no chronic disease. Recipients of blood-derived clotting factor concentrates have become ill with Hepatitis A, but there are no documented cases of the disease being transmitted in transfused blood.

=== Hepatitis B ===
Hepatitis B is The first virus routinely screened in blood donations. However, the Delta agent is not screened, since it is a superinfection of Hepatitis B and cannot exist alone.

=== Hepatitis C ===
Hepatitis C is often a silent infection, and is most likely significant TTI in developed countries.

==== Alanine transaminase (ALT) ====
Alanine transaminase (ALT) is used as a surrogate for other Hepatitis testing, losing favor now that HCV tests have improved.

=== Cytomegalovirus (CMV) ===
Cytomegalovirus is not relevant unless the recipient's immune system is compromised (i.e. infants).

=== SARS ===
SARS Donors are regularly screened. There is no demonstrated transmission, hypothetical risk, and no resurgence of disease.

=== Malaria (Plasmodia spp.) ===
Tests for malaria existence. It's endemic in many countries, especially countries near the equator. This is only relevant for red blood cell transfusions.

=== Babesiosis ===
Babesia microti is transmitted by ixodes ticks and causes babesiosis. Transfusion-associated babesiosis has been documented.

=== Syphilis ===
Syphilis does not survive at refrigerated temperatures. It is used as test for extremely high-risk sexual behavior.

=== Lyme disease ===
- No cases of Lyme disease have been reported, but the CDC urges caution due to a theoretical risk.

== Other bacteria ==
=== Bacteremia and platelets ===
Testing is part of the reason that platelet shelf life is extremely short.

== Variant Creutzfeldt–Jakob disease (vCJD) ==
- "Mad Cow"
- UK imported plasma for transfusion

== See also ==
- Osborn v. Irwin Memorial Blood Bank
