= Erythrocytapheresis =

Apheresis procedure

Erythrocytapheresis is an apheresis procedure by which erythrocytes (red blood cells) are separated from whole blood. It is an extracorporeal blood separation method whereby whole blood is extracted from a donor or patient, the red blood cells are separated, and the remaining blood is returned to circulation.

== Method ==
=== Overview ===
For the separation of erythrocytes, whole blood is passed through an apparatus that isolates the red blood cells from the remaining components. In erythrocytapheresis, centrifugation is the most commonly used red blood cell fractionation method. This is because the hematocrit, or the percentage of blood volume taken up by red blood cells, is present in the highest percentage of all blood cell components in the solid portion of blood. Therefore, since erythrocytes have the highest specific weight in comparison to other solids in blood, they can easily be separated using centrifugation. Whole blood is spun down in a spinning bowl centrifuge and the bottom layer, concentrated with erythrocytes, sediments to the bottom. These are separated and the rest of the blood can be retransfused.

=== Centrifugal sedimentation ===
Centrifugal sedimentation is the most used process by which erythrocytapheresis occurs. In this method, patient or donor blood is collected and processed into an erythrocyte concentrate with a high hematocrit content. This exhausted, pre-filtered blood is collected in a suitable reservoir and pumped into a rotating centrifuge. The centrifugal force will separate the red blood cells from other cells due to their high specific weight. These cells can then be collected. A separate washing step will lead to the removal of plasma parts which will further purify and concentrate erythrocytes. The remaining blood, consisting of blood plasma, leukocytes, platelets, stem cells, lipids, and other solids will then be retransfused into the patient or donor.

=== Developing methods ===
The advancement of centrifugation and membrane filtration methods is essential to the development of erythrocytapheresis. In addition, blood separation on microdevices containing capillary channels has been identified as a potential blood cell fractionation method. Other plasma and blood cell separation techniques are being explored based on magnetophoresis, electrophoresis, microchannel bends, and ultrasound standing waves.

== Application ==
Therapeutic erythrocytapheresis is commonly used to remove red blood cells in patients experiencing sickle cell crisis. The affected erythrocytes are removed while the rest of the blood is retransfused. This blood separation is also used in patients with severe malaria. After removal of the affected cells, the patient can then be transfused with a dose of normal red blood cells.

Erythrocytapheresis can also be used for blood donations. The procedure is commonly done using automated red blood cell collection which involves the removal of two units blood cells. This includes either two standard units of red blood cells or one unit plus of red blood cells and another of either plasma or platelets. The advantage to the donor is the use of smaller needles and saline compensation, as well as more convenient donating schedules (the no-donation period following apheresis is twice as long as that for a single unit). The advantage to the blood bankers is the on-line separation into standardized RBC masses with the subsequent reduction in testing, data entry and staffing. This process is commonly referred to as 'power reds', 'double reds' or 'double red cell apheresis'.
