= Journal of Investigative Dermatology =

- Discipline: Dermatology
- Language: English
- Edited by: Erwin Tschachler

Publication details
- History: 1938–present
- Publisher: Elsevier for the Society for Investigative Dermatology
- Frequency: Monthly
- Open access: Delayed, after 12 months
- Impact factor: 7 (2025)

Standard abbreviations
- ISO 4: J. Investig. Dermatol.
- NLM: J Invest Dermatol

Indexing
- CODEN: JIDEAE
- ISSN: 0022-202X (print); 1523-1747 (web)
- OCLC no.: 1063265653

Links
- Journal homepage; Online access; Online archive

The Journal of Investigative Dermatology is a peer-reviewed medical journal covering dermatology. It has been published by Elsevier since 2016 and the editor-in-chief is Erwin Tschachler (University of Vienna).

In 1972, it absorbed the journal Advances in Biology of Skin, also known as the Proceedings of the Brown University Symposium on the Biology of Skin.

== Abstracting and indexing ==
The journal is abstracted and indexed in:

- Biological Abstracts
- BIOSIS Previews
- CAB Abstracts
- Chemical Abstracts Service
- Current Contents/Clinical Medicine
- Current Contents/Life Sciences
- EBSCO databases
- Embase/Excerpta Medica
- Global Health
- Index Medicus/MEDLINE/PubMed
- PASCAL
- Science Citation Index Expanded

According to the Journal Citation Reports, the journal has a 2023 impact factor of 5.7.
