= Immunoadsorption =

Immunoadsorption is a procedure that removes specific blood group antibodies from the blood. It is needed to remove the antibodies against pathogenic antibodies.

The procedure generally takes about three to four hours.

Immunoadsorption was developed in the 1990s as a method of extracorporeal removal of molecules from the blood, in particular molecules of the immune system.

Different number of devices/columns exist on the market, each with a different active component to which the molecule of interest attaches, allowing for selectivity in the molecules of interest.

Immunoadsorption may be used as an alternative to plasma exchange in certain conditions. Evidence of benefit is lacking in those with kidney problems. Concerns include that it is expensive.

== Procedure ==
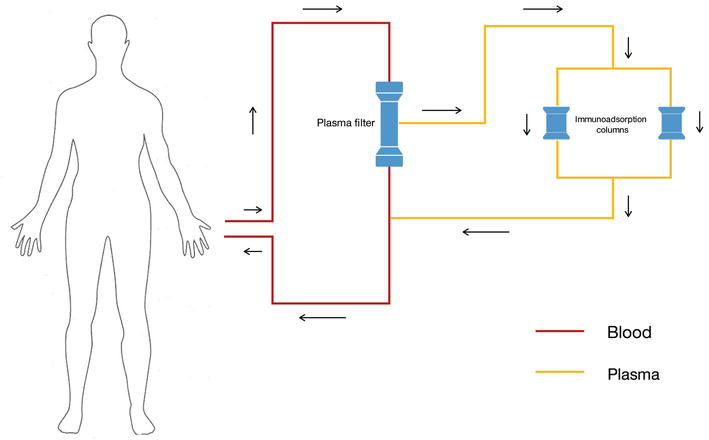
Immunoadsorption schematic

=== Dual column system ===
Blood first passes to plasma filter. Plasma then passes on to immunoadsorption column before returning to patient. As the plasma is passing through one column, the second column is being regenerated. Once the first column is saturated the flow switches to the second column while the first is then regenerated.

-1st step: the separation of plasma from the blood cells

-2nd step: the immunoadsorption column

Treatment prescriptions for immunoadsorption are based on plasma volumes with different recommendations for each condition and depending on the condition being treated, sessions can be daily or intermittent.

== The therapy ==
Immunoadsorption could be used in various autoimmune-mediated neurological diseases in order to remove autoimmune antibodies and other pathological constituents from the patients blood

It is increasingly recognized as a more specific alternative and generally appreciated for its potentially advantageous safety profile.

Immunoadsorption is also used in kidney transplantation for either the preparation of the ABO-incompatible or the highly sensitized kidney transplant candidate before transplantation, or the treatment of antibody-mediated rejection after transplantation.

== Indication ==
The most frequently encountered complication of immunoadsorption is an allergic reaction to the filter or adsorption column. Medication may be given before the procedure to minimize the risk.

Other side effects during the treatment could be dizziness, nausea or feeling cold.

The usage of immunoadsorption as medical procedure is still limited in some countries of the world, especially in Northern America. The additional costs for immunoadsorption are balanced by the reduced length of stay time as well as the reduced need of plasma substituting solutions and handling of side effects.
