= Leukoreduction =

Leukoreduction or leukocyte reduction is the process of removing or reducing the number of white blood cells (or leukocytes) from the blood or blood components supplied for blood transfusion. After the removal of the leukocytes, the blood product is said to be leukoreduced.

== Benefits and costs ==
It is theorized that transfusions that contain white blood cells may cause adverse effects through multiple mechanisms. White blood cells may themselves harbor infectious disease and some pathogens will be more concentrated in white blood cells than the rest of the blood product. It is also theorized that the donor white blood cells may suppress the recipient's immune system by interacting with it.

An April 2007 meta-analysis by Dr. Neil Blumberg and others and covering 3093 patients who received leukoreduced blood was published in the scientific journal Transfusion. According to the meta-analysis, use of leukoreduced blood reduced the frequency of post-transfusion infection by 50%. In a previous study, Blumberg and others reported that a change to universal use of leukoreduced blood at Strong Memorial Hospital at University of Rochester reduced post-transfusion infection by 33-45%.

However, other scientific studies question the effectiveness of leukoreduction. A March 2007 study by researchers at University of South Alabama Medical Center found no reduction of mortality or length of hospital stay in 439 trauma patients who received leukoreduced transfusions compared to 240 patients who did not. University of Washington researchers reported in October 2006 that a study of 286 transfused injury patients showed no reduction in mortality or length of stay, although a 16% reduction in rate of infection was shown with marginal statistical significance.

Leukoreduction has the inadvertent effect of removing approximately 10% of red blood cells from a processed unit of Red Blood Cells. Because blood from persons who possess the sickle cell mutation is difficult to filter, leukoreduction is often not performed on donors who may have the sickle cell gene, which is most common in people of African descent.

Dr. Blumberg, the lead author of the meta-analysis covering 3093 patients, stated in the press that the cost savings due to universal leukoreduction exceeds the cost of performing the leukoreduction. The cost of leukoreduction is an increase of approximately US$30 per unit of blood product.

== History of availability ==
As of 2008, most developed nations have adopted universal leukoreduction of transfusions (defined as the routine application of this blood-processing step to all units of whole blood, red blood cells, and platelets prior to storage) with the notable exception of the United States. Canada, Britain and France adopted universal leukoreduction in the late 1990s. Germany adopted it in 2001. Leukoreduced products are commonly available in the United States and some hospitals use only leukoreduced blood while others only use leukoreduced products in certain patient populations. For example, Strong Memorial Hospital began universal use of leukoreduced blood in July 2000; University of South Alabama Medical Center began use in January 2002. Woodlands Medical Centre is beginning a randomised controlled trial to look into the benefits of transfusing leukoreduced whole blood for the ICCU patients.

== See also ==
- Apheresis
- Plasmapheresis
- Venipuncture
