= Apadamtase alfa =

Medication

Clinical data
- Trade names: Adzynma
- Other names: ADAMTS13, recombinant-krhn; rADAMTS13
- AHFS/Drugs.com: Monograph
- License data: US DailyMed: Apadamtase alfa
- Routes of administration: Intravenous
- ATC code: None

Legal status
- Legal status: US: ℞-only; EU: Rx-only; In general: ℞ (Prescription only)

Identifiers
- CAS Number: 2086325-24-6
- DrugBank: DB15164
- UNII: U5SFU33XUX
- KEGG: D12569

Apadamtase alfa, sold under the brand name Adzynma, is an enzyme replacement therapy used for the treatment of thrombotic thrombocytopenic purpura. Apadamtase alfa is a human recombinant a disintegrin and metalloproteinase with thrombospondin motifs 13. It is given by injection into a vein.

The most common side effects include headache, diarrhea, migraine, abdominal pain, nausea, upper respiratory tract infection, dizziness and vomiting. During the clinical studies, no adverse events, including allergic reactions, were observed during the administration of Adzynma.

Apadamtase alfa was approved for medical use in the United States in November 2023, and in the European Union in August 2024.

== Medical uses ==
Apadamtase alfa is indicated for prophylactic (preventive) or on demand enzyme replacement therapy in people with congenital thrombotic thrombocytopenic purpura.

== History ==
The efficacy of apadamtase alfa in the prophylactic treatment of participants with congenital thrombotic thrombocytopenic purpura was evaluated in 46 participants who were randomized to receive six months of treatment with either apadamtase alfa or plasma based therapies (Period 1), then crossed over to the other treatment for six months (Period 2). The efficacy was demonstrated based on the incidence of thrombotic thrombocytopenic purpura events, and thrombotic thrombocytopenic purpura manifestations, as well as the incidence of the need for supplemental doses.

The efficacy of on demand enzyme replacement therapy was evaluated based on the proportion of acute thrombotic thrombocytopenic purpura events responding to apadamtase alfa in both the prophylactic and the on-demand cohorts throughout the duration of the study. All acute and subacute thrombotic thrombocytopenic purpura events resolved after treatment with either apadamtase alfa or plasma based therapies.

The US Food and Drug Administration (FDA) granted the application for apadamtase alfa priority review, fast track, and orphan drug designations. The FDA granted approval of Adzynma to Takeda Pharmaceuticals U.S.A. Inc.

== Society and culture ==
=== Legal status ===
In May 2024, the Committee for Medicinal Products for Human Use (CHMP) of the European Medicines Agency (EMA) adopted a positive opinion, recommending the granting of a marketing authorization under exceptional circumstances for the medicinal product Adzynma, indicated for the treatment of ADAMTS13 deficiency in people with congenital thrombotic thrombocytopenic purpura (cTTP). The applicant for this medicinal product is Takeda Manufacturing Austria AG. The active substance of Adzynma is recombinant ADAMTS13 (rADAMTS13). Apadamtase alfa was approved for medical use in the European Union in August 2024.
