= Cryosupernatant =

Blood product made from blood plasma

The term cryosupernatant (also called cryo-poor plasma, cryoprecipitate depleted, cryoprecipitate reduced plasma) refers to plasma from which the cryoprecipitate has been removed. It is used to treat thrombocytopenic purpura.

== Components ==
The resulting plasma has reduced levels of factor VIII (FVIII), von Willebrand factor (VWF), factor XIII (FXIII), fibronectin and fibrinogen. While the levels of FVIII are greatly reduced, levels of fibrinogen can be as much as 70% of original levels.

== Uses ==
Cryosupernatant plasma can be used when replacement of FVIII is not required, and is indicated for plasma exchange for patients with thrombotic thrombocytopenic purpura (TTP) as well as for treatment of hemolytic-uremic syndrome (HUS) by plasma exchange, when plasma exchange is indicated.
