= Caplacizumab =

Chemical compound

Monoclonal antibody
- Type: Single domain antibody
- Source: Humanized
- Target: von Willebrand factor (VWF)

Clinical data
- Trade names: Cablivi
- Other names: ALX-0081, caplacizumab-yhdp
- AHFS/Drugs.com: Monograph
- MedlinePlus: a619030
- License data: US DailyMed: Caplacizumab
- Pregnancy category: AU: B1
- Routes of administration: Intravenous, subcutaneous
- ATC code: B01AX07 (WHO)

Legal status
- Legal status: AU: S4 (Prescription only); CA: ℞-only / Schedule D; UK: POM (Prescription only); US: ℞-only; EU: Rx-only

Identifiers
- CAS Number: 915810-67-2
- DrugBank: DB06081
- ChemSpider: none
- UNII: 2R27AB6766
- KEGG: D11160

Chemical and physical data
- Formula: C_{1213}H_{1891}N_{357}O_{380}S_{10}
- Molar mass: 27876.19 g·mol^{−1}

Caplacizumab, sold under the brand name Cablivi, is a monoclonal antibody used for the treatment of thrombotic thrombocytopenic purpura. It is a von Willebrand factor-directed antibody fragment. It is given via intravenous injection followed by subcutaneous injection. Caplacizumab was developed by Ablynx NV.

Caplacizumab was authorized for medical use in the European Union in August 2018, and approved for medical use in the United States in February 2019. The US Food and Drug Administration considers it to be a first-in-class medication.

== Medical uses ==
Caplacizumab is indicated for the treatment of acquired thrombotic thrombocytopenic purpura, in combination with plasma exchange and immunosuppressive therapy.

== Side effects ==
Common adverse effects include injection site reactions, reported in 3–6% of patients in the HERCULES and TITAN trials.

== Society and culture ==
=== Legal status ===
Caplacizumab was authorized for medical use in the European Union in August 2018, and approved for medical use in the United States in February 2019.

=== Economics ===
The cost-effectiveness has been questioned.

=== Names ===
Caplacizumab is the international nonproprietary name and the United States Adopted Name.

== Research ==
Use of caplacizumab without plasmapheresis has been reported. The MAYARI study was designed to evaluate the effectiveness of this option.
