= Hamburger disease =

Hamburger disease may refer to:

- Hemolytic uremic syndrome: a disease caused by E. coli O157:H7
  - Hemorrhagic colitis: a precursor to hemolytic uremic syndrome
- Proliferative gill disease
