= Eli Moschcowitz =

American doctor (1879–1964)

- Born: 2 August 1879; Girált, Sáros County, Kingdom of Hungary, Austria-Hungary (present-day Giraltovce, Prešov Region, Slovakia)
- Died: 23 February 1964 (aged 84); Manhattan, New York City, New York, U.S.
- Citizenship: American
- Education: Columbia University College of Physicians and Surgeons
- Known for: Discovery of thrombotic thrombocytopenic purpura
- Scientific career
- Fields: Medicine, Pathology
- Workplaces: Columbia University College of Physicians and Surgeons Beth Israel Medical Center Mount Sinai Hospital (Manhattan)

Eli Moschcowitz (2 August 1879 – 23 February 1964) was an American doctor best known for his role in discovering thrombotic thrombocytopenic purpura (TTP), which was originally called "Moschcowitz syndrome". He is also known for having an early role in the development of psychosomatic medicine.

== Early life ==
Moschcowitz was born to a Jewish family in Girált, Hungary.

== Career ==
Moschcowitz received a medical degree from Columbia University College of Physicians and Surgeons. He spent much of his career as a pathologist at Beth Israel Medical Center in Manhattan, and was later medical director of Mount Sinai Hospital (Manhattan) and Professor of Clinical Medicine at Columbia. He was also a Diplomate of the American Board of Internal Medicine.

In 1925 Moschcowitz described the autopsy pathology of a young female patient who died of a disease that first caused petechiae, pallor, paralysis, and coma. Her blood vessels were largely filled with platelets. Modern reports still occasionally refer to TTP as "Moschcowitz disease" or "Moschcowitz syndrome".

== Chess ==
Moschcowitz was a member of the Manhattan Chess Club. When the former world chess champion José Raúl Capablanca collapsed in what would prove to be his fatal stroke, Moschcowitz arranged the ambulance to take him to Mount Sinai Hospital. After Capablanca died the next morning, Moschcowitz was one of the three doctors who performed the full autopsy.

== See also ==
- Thrombotic thrombocytopenic purpura
- ADAMTS13
- John Vivian Dacie
