= National Donor Deferral Registry =

The National Donor Deferral Registry, also known as the (NDDR) is a database of individuals who have tested "reactive" for viral agents like human immunodeficiency viruses (HIV), Hepatitis B virus (HBV), and hepatitis C virus (HCV) and are permanently prohibited from donating plasma. NDDR is a registered trademark of the Plasma Protein Therapeutics Association. U.S. regulations require organizations that collect plasma screens for viruses and flag donors and keep a list. The NDDR was established in 1993. This is to help plasma donation centers notify other centers of a donor who has tested positive for one of the listed viruses. The NDDR is temporary

== Government Regulations ==
The NDDR is a confidential database that is used in North America and the United States to help provide the collection of safe plasma donation through plasmapheresis. When identifying information is matched in the registry, the donation center should not accept a person donation. The U.S. Food and Drug Administration lists the requirements for donor federal in 21 CFR § 610.41

In November 2020, the U.S. Food and Drug Administration reviewed a Section 510(k) premarket notification of a cloud-based version of the NDDR by Headspring Healthcare, Inc. The new web-based systems would allow

- Allow blood and plasma collection facilities to retrieve recent dates of a donor's donations of blood or blood components (including Source Plasma) via the web, or through an electronic interface, for the purpose of determining if the frequency of an individual's donations is in compliance with Plasma Protein Therapeutics Association's (PPTA's) standards and applicable regulatory requirements
- Allow blood and plasma collection facilities to retrieve basic underlying information about a donor to aid and assist in the determination of a donor's eligibility to donate blood or plasma.
- Allow donor deferral information to be added, updated and deleted via a web page.

Each donation center is responsible for checking the NDDR prior to donation and uploading any positive or reactive tests for each donor. An International Quality Plasma Program (IQPP) facility is a lab that has agreed to the voluntary standards program of the PPTA.

The personally identifiable information (PII) that is collected is "individual's donor ID, first and last name, middle initial birthdate and gender. The donor's social security number or INDS number."

=== Requalification of previously deferred donors ===
The FDA has established rules under how a previously deferred donor may be able to requalify. There are two methods which the FDA has adopted.

- The previous deferral was for a defined period of time and that time period has passed, or the deferral was otherwise temporary, such as a deferral based on eligibility criteria

or

- A deferred donor subsequently may be found to be eligible as a donor of blood or blood components by a requalification method or process found acceptable for such purposes by FDA. Such a donor is considered no longer deferred.

It was not until May 2010 when the FDA published a way for individuals to be requalified due to repeatedly reactive test for anti-HBC. The FDA admitted that up to 21,500 people in the late 1980s and 1990s because of "false positive" tests results. The FDA estimated that almost 200,000 donors could be eligible for reentry.

=== Errors on registry ===
There is no central agency responsible for reviewing or correcting errors. Each company that inputs data into the NDDR must have a written procedure to correct errors.

A Woman in Des Moines, Iowa, was listed on the NDDR after having a 'reactive' test for HIV however, after additional testing was found to be negative for HIV.
