= Thrombotic microangiopathy =

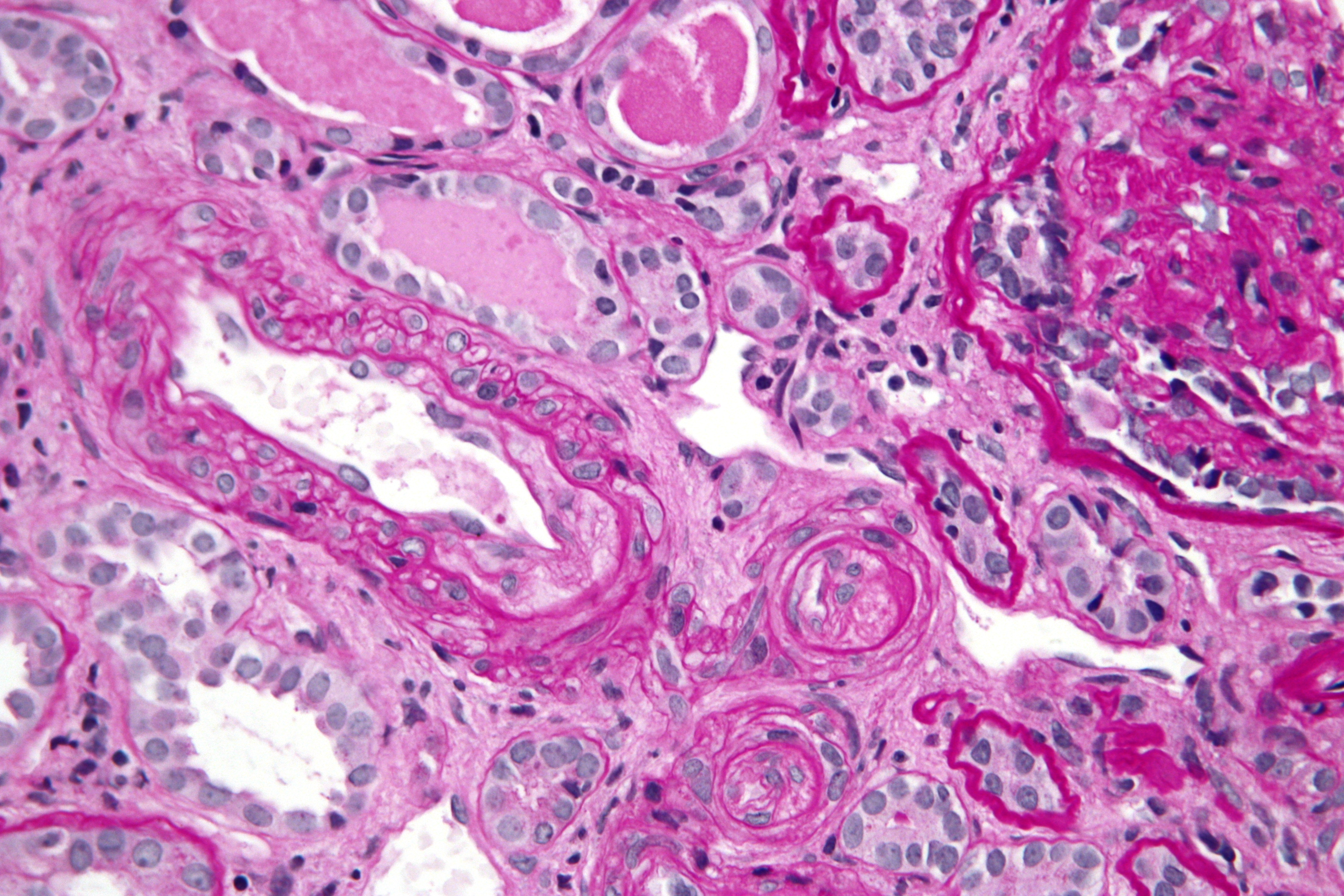
- Micrograph of thrombotic microangiopathy with the characteristic onion-skin layering seen in older lesions. PAS stain.
- Specialty: Rheumatology

Thrombotic microangiopathy (TMA) is a pathology that results in thrombosis in capillaries and arterioles, due to an endothelial injury. It may be seen in association with thrombocytopenia, anemia, purpura and kidney failure.

The classic TMAs are hemolytic uremic syndrome and thrombotic thrombocytopenic purpura. Other conditions with TMA include atypical hemolytic uremic syndrome, disseminated intravascular coagulation, scleroderma renal crisis, malignant hypertension, antiphospholipid antibody syndrome, and drug toxicities, e.g. calcineurin inhibitor toxicity.

== Signs and symptoms ==
The clinical presentation of TMA, although dependent on the type, typically includes: fever, microangiopathic hemolytic anemia (see schistocytes in a blood smear), kidney failure, thrombocytopenia and neurological manifestations. Generally, renal complications are particularly predominant with Shiga-toxin-associated hemolytic uremic syndrome (STx-HUS) and atypical HUS, whereas neurologic complications are more likely with TTP. Individuals with milder forms of TTP may have recurrent symptomatic episodes, including seizures and vision loss. With more threatening cases of TMA, and also as the condition progresses without treatment, multi-organ failure or injury is also possible, as the hyaline thrombi can spread to and affect the brain, kidneys, heart, liver, and other major organs.

== Cause ==
The specific cause is dependent of the type of TMA that is presented, but the two main pathways that lead to TMA are external triggers of vascular injury, such as viruses, bacterial Shiga toxins or endotoxins, antibodies, and drugs; and congenital predisposing conditions, including decreased levels of tissue factors necessary for the coagulation cascade. Either of these pathways will result in decreased endothelial thromboresistance, leukocyte adhesion to damaged endothelium, complement consumption, enhanced vascular shear stress, and abnormal vWF fragmentation. The central and primary event in this progression is injury to the endothelial cells, which reduces the production of prostaglandin and prostacyclin, ultimately resulting in the loss of physiological thromboresistance, or high thrombus formation rate in blood vessels. Leukocyte adhesion to the damaged endothelial wall and abnormal von Willebrand factor (or vWF) release can also contribute to the increase in thrombus formation. More recently, researchers have attributed both TTP and HUS to targeted agents, such as targeted cancer therapies, immunotoxins, and anti-VEGF therapy.

Bacterial toxins are the primary cause of one category of thrombotic microangiopathy known as HUS or hemolytic uremic syndrome. HUS can be divided into two main categories: Shiga-toxin-associated HUS (STx-HUS), which normally presents with diarrhea, and atypical HUS. The Shiga-toxin inhibits the binding of eEF-1-dependent binding of aminoacyl tRNA to the 60S subunit of the ribosome, thus inhibiting protein synthesis. The cytotoxicity from the lack of protein damages glomerular endothelial cells by creating voids in the endothelial wall and detaching the basement membrane of the endothelial layer, activating the coagulation cascade. Atypical HUS may be caused by an infection or diarrheal illness or it may be genetically transmitted. This category of TMA encompasses all forms that do not have obvious etiologies. Mutations in three of the proteins in the complement cascade have been identified in patients with atypical HUS. Several chemotherapeutic drugs have also been shown to cause damage to the epithelial layer by reducing the ability for the cells to produce prostacyclin, ultimately resulting in chemotherapy-associated HUS, or C-HUS.

The second category of TMAs is TTP thrombotic thrombocytopenic purpura, which can be divided into 3 categories: congenital, idiopathic, and non-idiopathic. Congenital and idiopathic TTP are generally associated with deficiencies in ADAMTS13, a zinc metalloprotease responsible for cleaving Very Large vWF Multimers in order to prevent inappropriate platelet aggregation and thrombosis in the microvasculature. Natural genetic mutations resulting in the deficiency of ADAMTS13 have been found in homozygous and heterozygous pedigrees in Europe. Researchers have identified common pathways and links between TTP and HUS, while other sources express skepticism about their common pathophysiology.

The repression of the vascular endothelial growth factor (VEGF) can also cause glomerular TMA (damage to the glomerular microvasculature). It is likely that the absence of VEGF results in the collapse of fenestrations in the glomerular endothelium, thus causing microvascular injury and blockages associated with TMA.

Manifestations resembling thrombotic microangiopathy have been reported in clinical trials evaluating high doses of valacyclovir (8000 mg/day) administered for prolonged periods (months to years) for prophylaxis of cytomegalovirus (CMV) infection and disease, particularly in persons with HIV infection. A number of factors may have contributed to the incidence of thrombotic microangiopathy in those trials including profound immunosuppression, underlying diseases (advanced HIV disease, graft-versus-host disease), and other classes of drug, particularly antifungal agents. There were no reports of thrombotic microangiopathy among the 3050 subjects in the four trials evaluating Valacyclovir for suppression of recurrent genital herpes. Although one of the trials was in HIV-infected subjects, the patients did not have advanced HIV disease. The implication is that the occurrence of thrombotic microangiopathy is restricted to severely immunosuppressed persons receiving higher Valacyclovir dosages than are required to control HSV infection.

== Diagnosis ==
CBC and blood film: decreased platelets and schistocytes. PT, aPTT, fibrinogen: normal. Markers of hemolysis: increased unconjugated bilirubin, increased LDH, decreased haptoglobin negative Coombs test. Creatinine, urea, to follow renal function. ADAMSTS-13 gene, activity or inhibitor testing (TTP).

== Treatment ==
The course of treatment and the success rate is dependent on the type of TMA. Some patients with atypical HUS and TTP have responded to plasma infusions or exchanges, a procedure which replaces proteins necessary for the complement cascade that the patient does not have; however, this is not a permanent solution or treatment, especially for patients with congenital predispositions.

Narsoplimab (Yartemlea) was approved for medical use in the United States in December 2025.

== See also ==
- Microangiopathy
- Microangiopathic hemolytic anemia
