= Schistocyte =

Fragmented portion of a red blood cell

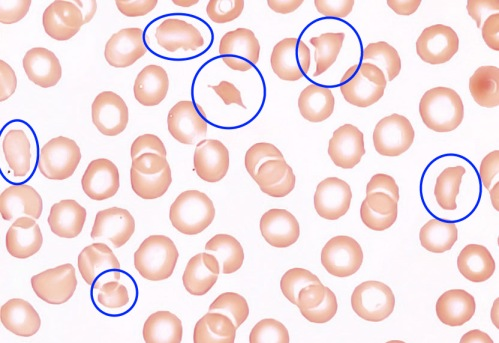
Peripheral blood smear in patient with thrombotic thrombocytopenic purpura. Typical schistocytes are annotated.

A schistocyte (from Greek schistos for "divided" and kytos for "hollow" or "cell") is a fragmented part of a red blood cell.

Several microangiopathic diseases, including disseminated intravascular coagulation and thrombotic microangiopathies, generate fibrin strands that sever red blood cells as they try to move past a thrombus, creating schistocytes.

Schistocytes are often seen in patients with hemolytic anemia. They are frequently a consequence of mechanical artificial heart valves, aortic stenosis, hemolytic uremic syndrome, and thrombotic thrombocytopenic purpura, among other causes. Excessive schistocytes present in blood can be a sign of microangiopathic hemolytic anemia (MAHA).

== Appearance ==
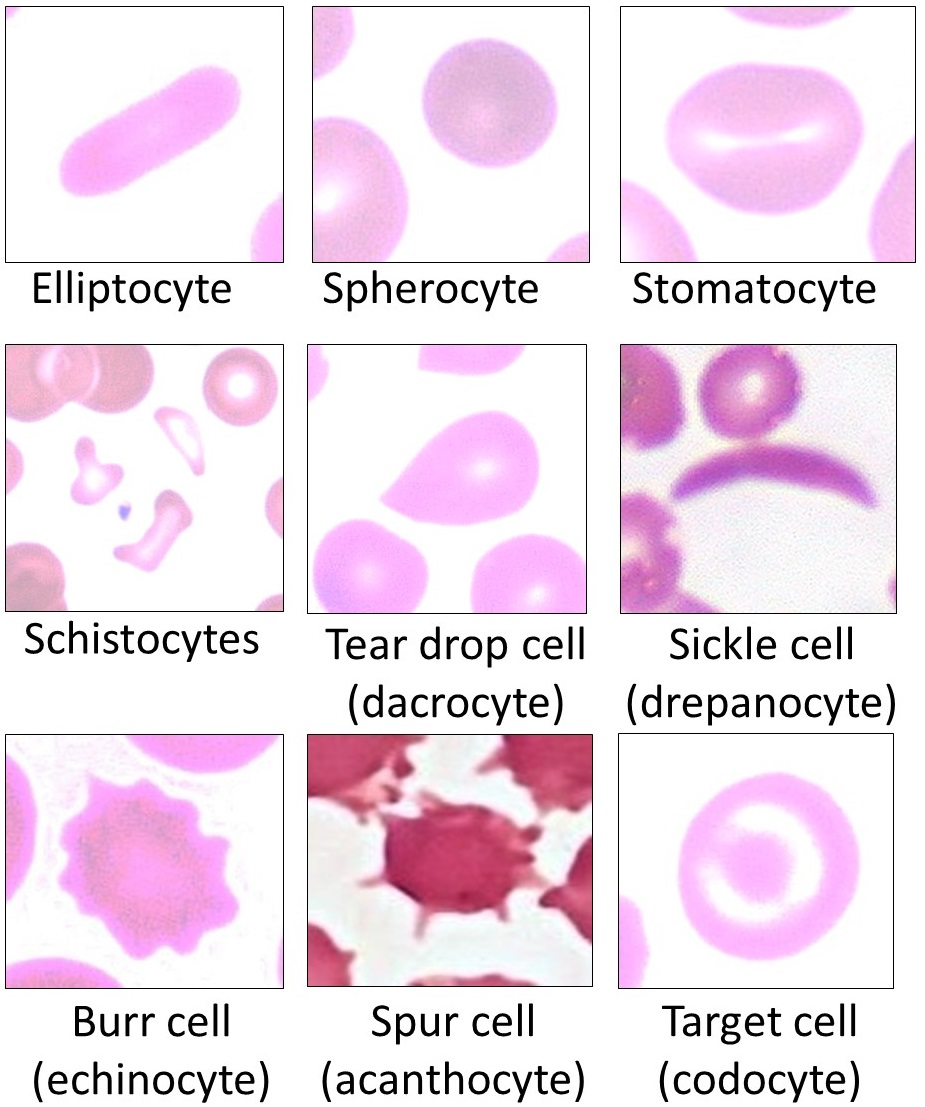
Schistocytes compared to other forms of poikilocytosis

Schistocytes are fragmented red blood cells that can take on different shapes. They can be found as triangular, helmet shaped, or comma shaped with pointed edges. Schistocytes are most often found to be microcytic with no area of central pallor. There is usually no change in deformability, but their lifespan is lower than that of a normal red blood cell (120 days). This is due to their abnormal shape which can cause them to undergo hemolysis or be removed by macrophages in the spleen.

== Pathophysiology ==
Schistocyte formation occurs as a result of mechanical destruction (fragmentation hemolysis) of a normal red blood cell. This occurs when there is damage to the blood vessel and a clot begins to form. The formation of the fibrin strands in the vessels occurs as part of the clot formation process. The red blood cells get trapped in the fibrin strands and the shear force of the blood flow causes the red blood cell to break. The resulting fragmented cell is called the schistocyte.

== Schistocyte count ==
A normal schistocyte count for a healthy individual is <0.5% although usual values are found to be <0.2%. A schistocyte count of >1% is most often found in thrombotic thrombocytopenic purpura, although they are more often seen within the range of 3–10% for this condition. A schistocyte count of <1% but greater than the normal value is suggestive of disseminated intravascular coagulation, but is not an absolute diagnosis. The standard for a schistocyte count is a microscopic examination of a peripheral blood smear.

== Conditions ==
Schistocytes on the peripheral blood smear is a characteristic feature of microangiopathic hemolytic anemia (MAHA). The causes of MAHA can be disseminated intravascular coagulation, thrombotic thrombocytopenic purpura, hemolytic-uremic syndrome, HELLP syndrome, malfunctioning cardiac valves etc. In most of the conditions, schistocytes are formed by fibrin formation and entrapment of red blood cells leading to fragmentation due to the force of blood flow in the vessels.

=== Disseminated intravascular coagulation ===
Disseminated intravascular coagulation or DIC is caused by a systemic response to a specific condition including sepsis and severe infection, malignancy, obstetric complications, massive tissue injury, or systemic diseases. Disseminated intravascular coagulation is an activation of the coagulation cascade which is usually a result of an increased exposure to tissue factor. The activation of the cascade leads to thrombi formation which causes an accumulation of excess fibrin formation in the intravascular circulation. The excess fibrin strands cause mechanical damage to the red blood cells resulting in schistocyte formation and also thrombocytopenia and consumption of clotting factors. Schistocyte values between .5% and 1% are usually suggestive of DIC.

=== Thrombotic thrombocytopenic purpura ===
Thrombotic thrombocytopenic purpura or TTP is caused by primary platelet activation. Thrombotic thrombocytopenic purpura leads to increased amounts of large von Willebrand factor which then attach to activated platelets and mediate further platelet aggregation. Platelets end up being removed and the resulting fibrin strand formation remains. These fibrin strands along with the stress from the blood flow cause fragmentation of the red blood cells, leading to schistocyte formation. In TTP, a schistocyte count between 3–10% is common, but >1% is suggestive of the disease.

=== Hemolytic-uremic syndrome ===
Hemolytic-uremic syndrome or HUS is hemolytic anaemia, acute kidney failure (uremia), and thrombocytopenia. HUS is caused by E. coli bloody diarrhea and specific strains of shiga toxin. The bacteria in HUS cause damage to the endothelium which results in platelet activation and formation of microthrombi. Red cells get trapped in the fibrin strands of the microthrombi and become sheared by the force of blood flow leading to schistocyte formation.

=== Malfunctioning cardiac valves ===
Leaky prosthetic heart valves and other cardiac assisted devices can lead to microangiopathic hemolytic anemia (with schistocyte formation) and thrombocytopenia. The force from the blood flow over the high pressure gradient from the prosthesis leads to fragmentation of red cells, and schistocyte formation. This is rare and only occurs in about 3% of patients.
