= Microangiopathic hemolytic anemia =

- Other names: MAHA
- Specialty: Hematology

Microangiopathic hemolytic anemia (MAHA) is a microangiopathic subgroup of hemolytic anemia (loss of red blood cells through destruction) caused by factors in the small blood vessels. It is identified by the finding of anemia and schistocytes on microscopy of the blood film.

== Signs and symptoms ==
In diseases such as hemolytic uremic syndrome, disseminated intravascular coagulation, thrombotic thrombocytopenic purpura, and malignant hypertension, the endothelial layer of small vessels is damaged with resulting fibrin deposition and platelet aggregation. As red blood cells travel through these damaged vessels, they are fragmented resulting in intravascular hemolysis. The resulting schistocytes (red cell fragments) are also increasingly targeted for destruction by the reticuloendothelial system in the spleen, due to their narrow passage through obstructed vessel lumina. It is seen in systemic lupus erythematosus, where immune complexes aggregate with platelets, forming intravascular thrombi. Microangiopathic hemolytic anemia is also seen in cancer.

Microangiopathic hemolytic anemia may be suspected based on routine medical laboratory tests such as a CBC (complete blood cell count). Automated analysers (the machines that perform routine full blood counts in most hospitals) are designed to flag blood specimens that contain abnormal amounts of red blood cell fragments or schistocytes.

== Causes ==
- Disseminated intravascular coagulation
- HELLP syndrome
- Thrombotic thrombocytopenic purpura
- Hemolytic uremic syndrome
- Atypical hemolytic uremic syndrome
- Cancer
- Malignant hypertension
- Scleroderma renal crisis
- Malfunctioning cardiac valves (called the "Waring Blender syndrome")
- Kasabach–Merritt syndrome
- Insertion of foreign bodies
- Drugs (e.g. cancer chemotherapy)
- Snake envenomation
- others diseases: eclampsia, renal allograft rejection, paroxysmal nocturnal hemoglobinuria, scleroderma, and vasculitides such as polyarteritis nodosa and granulomatosis with polyangiitis, antiphospholipid syndrome

== Pathophysiology ==
In all causes, the mechanism of MAHA is the formation of a fibrin mesh due to increased activation of the system of coagulation. The red blood cells are physically cut by these protein networks. The resulting fragments are the schistocytes observed in light microscopy

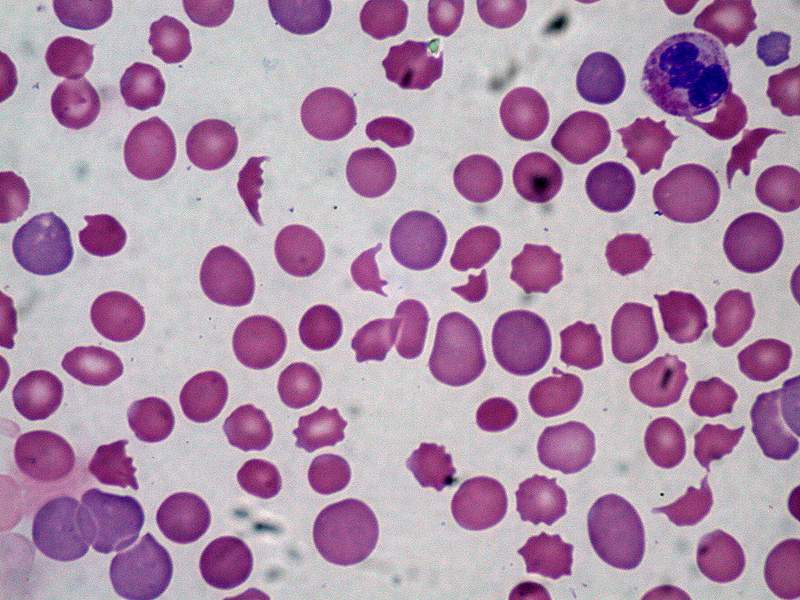
Schistocytes or helmet cells

== Diagnosis ==
Microangiopathic hemolytic anemia results in isolated increase in serum bilirubin levels. Unconjugated hyperbilirubinemia above 15% is present. The differential diagnoses are rifampicin or probenecid use, inherited disorders like Gilbert's syndrome and other hemolytic disorders. On peripheral smears, fragmented RBCs, burr cells, helmet cells and triangle cells are seen.

== Treatment ==
Platelets and cryoprecipitate are contraindicated as they facilitate further clot formation and RBC lysis. Plasmapheresis is one treatment for TTP; corticosteroids should also be considered. {mcn}
