= Inherited thrombotic thrombocytopenic purpura =

Genetic disorder

Thrombotic thrombocytopenic purpura (TTP) is a life-threatening disorder characterized by thrombocytopenia and microangiopathic hemolytic anemia accompanied by variable neurological dysfunction, kidney failure, and fever. It is caused by severely reduced activity of the von Willebrand factor-cleaving protease ADAMTS13. Hereditary TTP, caused by ADAMTS13 gene mutations, is much less common.

Congenital or inherited TTP represents less than 5% of all cases of TTP and the annual incidence is estimated at less than 1/1,000,000. More than 80 different mutations have been identified in families with hereditary TTP.Most patients are carriers of compound heterozygous mutations. Only 15 mutations have been observed in homozygous form, including a homozygous deletion of nucleotides 2930–2935 in exon 23 of ADAMTS13.
