= ADAMTS13 =

Metalloprotease enzyme

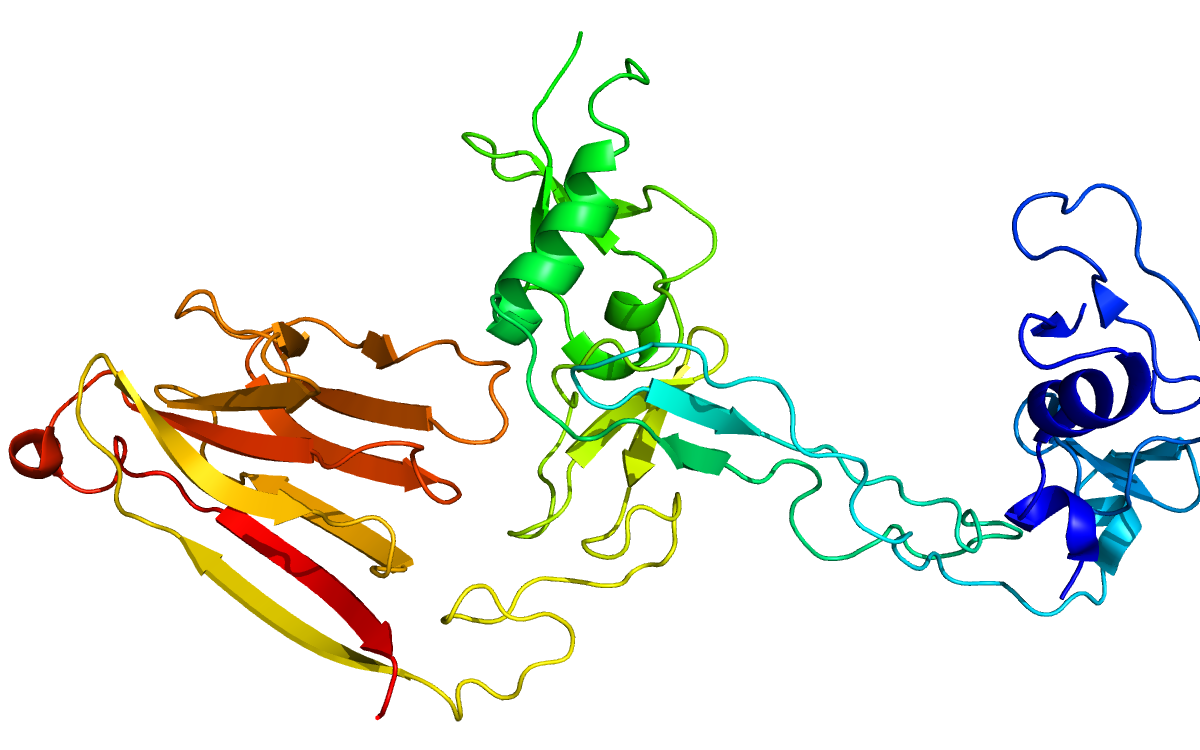

Identifiers
- Aliases: ADAMTS13, ADAM-TS13, ADAMTS-13, C9orf8, VWFCP, vWF-CP, ADAM metallopeptidase with thrombospondin type 1 motif 13
- External IDs: OMIM: 604134; MGI: 2685556; GeneCards: ADAMTS13
Available structures
PDB	Ortholog search: PDBe RCSB
PDB	List of PDB id codes 3GHM, 3GHN
Enzyme activity
EC #	BRENDA	ExPASy	KEGG	MetaCyc
3.4.24.87	↗	↗	↗	↗

Gene location (Human)
Chr.	Chromosome 9 (human)
Band	9q34.2	Start	133,414,358 bp
Band	9q34.2	End	133,459,402 bp

Gene location (Mouse)
Chr.	Chromosome 2 (mouse)
Band	2|2 A3	Start	26,863,428 bp
Band	2|2 A3	End	26,899,640 bp
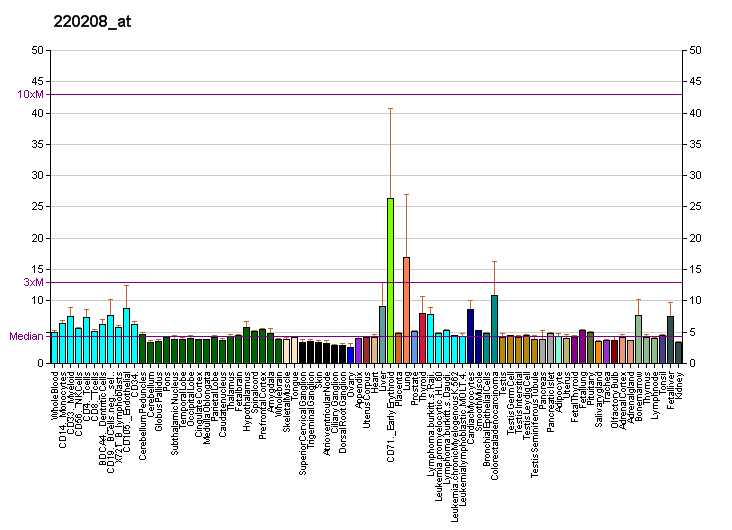
RNA expression pattern
Bgee	Human / Mouse (ortholog); Top expressed in: right lobe of liver; right hemisphere of cerebellum; right uterine tube; right frontal lobe; right testis; left testis; primary visual cortex; pituitary gland; apex of heart; Brodmann area 9 / Top expressed in: liver; dentate gyrus of hippocampal formation granule cell; morula; bone marrow; embryo; esophagus; hippocampus proper; primary visual cortex; yolk sac; superior frontal gyrus; More reference expression data
BioGPS	More reference expression data
Gene ontology
Molecular function	calcium ion binding; endopeptidase activity; metal ion binding; integrin binding; peptidase activity; protein binding; metalloendopeptidase activity; hydrolase activity; metallopeptidase activity; zinc ion binding
Cellular component	endoplasmic reticulum lumen; extracellular region; cell surface; extracellular space; extracellular matrix
Biological process	hemostasis; glycoprotein metabolic process; response to interleukin-4; response to interferon-gamma; protein processing; blood coagulation; proteolysis; platelet activation; response to tumor necrosis factor; integrin-mediated signaling pathway; cell-matrix adhesion; response to toxic substance; peptide catabolic process; response to potassium ion; cellular response to interferon-gamma; cellular response to lipopolysaccharide; response to amine; cellular response to interleukin-4; cellular response to tumor necrosis factor
Sources:Amigo / QuickGO
Orthologs
Databases	NCBI: entry; OMA: entry
Species	Human	Mouse
Entrez	11093	279028
Ensembl	ENSG00000160323; ENSG00000281244	ENSMUSG00000014852
UniProt	Q76LX8	Q769J6
RefSeq (mRNA)	NM_139025; NM_139026; NM_139027; NM_139028	NM_001001322; NM_001290463; NM_001290464; NM_001290465
RefSeq (protein)	NP_620594; NP_620595; NP_620596	NP_001001322; NP_001277392; NP_001277393; NP_001277394
Location (UCSC)	Chr 9: 133.41 – 133.46 Mb	Chr 2: 26.86 – 26.9 Mb
PubMed search
- Wikidata
View/Edit Human	View/Edit Mouse

ADAMTS13 (a disintegrin and metalloproteinase with a thrombospondin type 1 motif, member 13)—also known as von Willebrand factor-cleaving protease (VWFCP)—is a zinc-containing metalloprotease enzyme that cleaves von Willebrand factor (vWf), a large protein involved in blood clotting. It is secreted into the blood and degrades large vWf multimers, decreasing their activity, hence ADAMTS13 acts to reduce thrombus formation.

== Genetics ==
The ADAMTS13 gene maps to the ninth chromosome (9q34).

== Discovery ==
Since 1982 it had been known that thrombotic thrombocytopenic purpura (TTP), one of the microangiopathic hemolytic anemias (see below), was characterized in its familial form by the presence in plasma of unusually large von Willebrand factor multimers (ULVWF).

In 1994, vWF was shown to be cleaved between a tyrosine at position 1605 and a methionine at 1606 by a plasma metalloprotease enzyme when it was exposed to high levels of shear stress. In 1996, two research groups independently further characterized this enzyme. In the next two years, the same two groups showed that the congenital deficiency of a vWF-cleaving protease was associated with formation of platelet microthrombi in the small blood vessels. In addition, they reported that IgG antibodies directed against this same enzyme caused TTP in a majority of non-familial cases.

== Proteomics ==
Genomically, ADAMTS13 shares many properties with the 19 member ADAMTS family, all of which are characterised by a protease domain (the part that performs the protein hydrolysis), an adjacent disintegrin domain and one or more thrombospondin domains. ADAMTS13 in fact has eight thrombospondin domains. It has no hydrophobic transmembrane domain, and hence it is not anchored in the cell membrane.

== Role in disease ==
Deficiency of ADAMTS13 was originally discovered in Upshaw Schulman Syndrome, the recurring familial form of thrombotic thrombocytopenic purpura. By that time it was already suspected that TTP occurred in the autoimmune form as well, owing to its response to plasmapheresis and characterisation of IgG inhibitors. Since the discovery of ADAMTS13, specific epitopes on its surface have been shown to be the target of inhibitory antibodies.

Low levels of ADAMTS13 are also associated with an increased risk of arterial thrombosis, including myocardial infarction and cerebrovascular disease.

Finally, since the link between aortic valve stenosis and angiodysplasia was proven to be due to high shear stress (Heyde's syndrome), it has been accepted that increased exposure of vWf to ADAMTS13 due to various reasons would predispose to bleeding by causing increased degradation of vWf. This phenomenon is characterised by a form of von Willebrand disease (type 2a).

== See also ==
- ADAMTS5
