= Plasmapheresis =

Removal, treatment and return of blood plasma

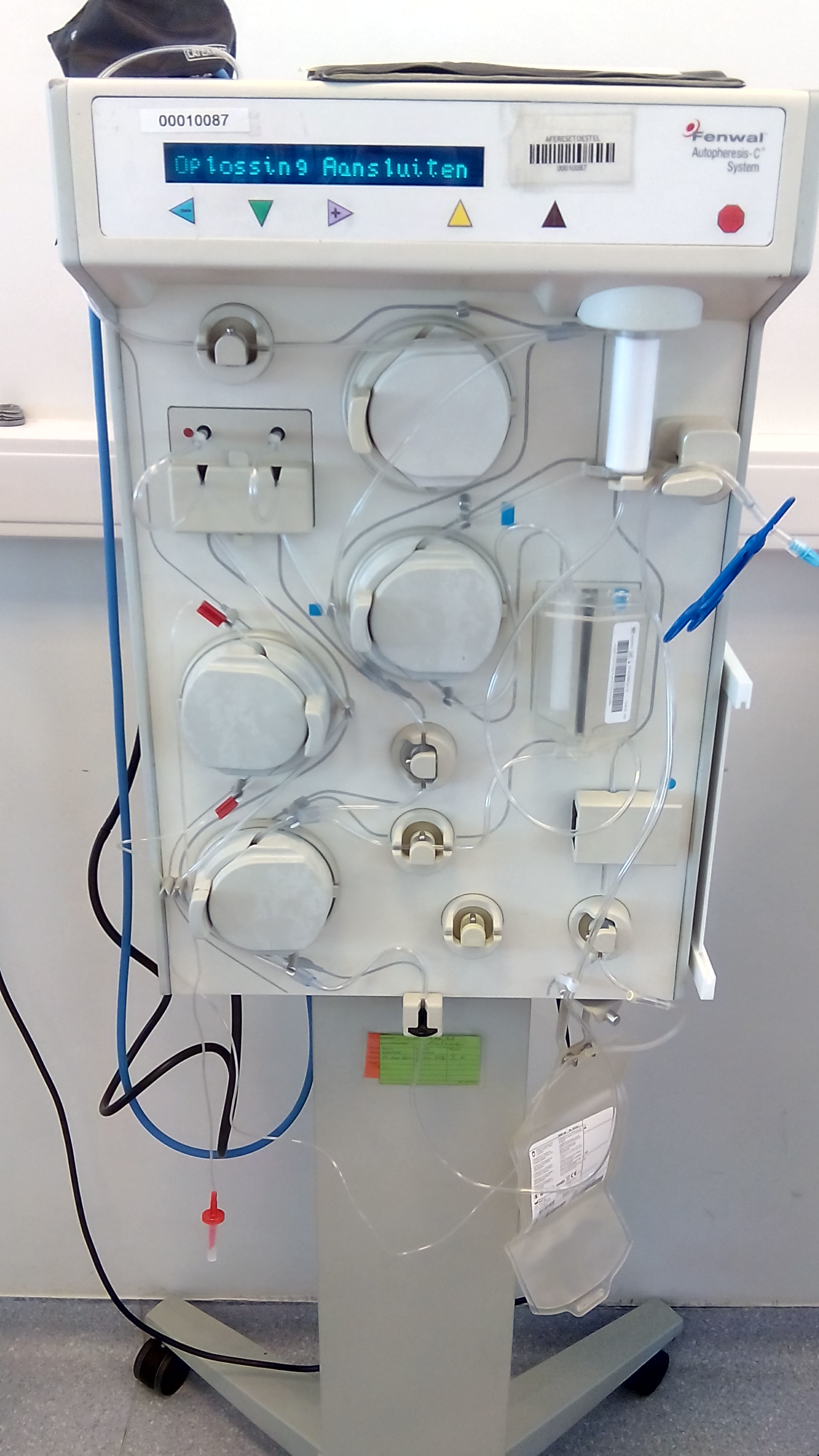
- Plasmapheresis machine
- ICD-10-PCS: 6A5
- ICD-9-CM: 99.7
- MeSH: D010956

Plasmapheresis (from the Greek πλάσμα, plasma, something molded, and ἀφαίρεσις aphairesis, taking away) is the removal, treatment, and return or exchange of blood plasma or components thereof from and to the blood circulation. It is thus an extracorporeal therapy, a medical procedure performed outside the body.

Three general types of plasmapheresis can be distinguished:

- Autologous, removing blood plasma, treating it in some way, and returning it to the same person, as a therapy. This is also called cascade filtration.
- Exchange, a patient's blood plasma is removed, while blood products are given in replacement. This type is called plasma exchange (PE, PLEX, or PEX) or plasma exchange therapy (PET). The removed plasma is discarded and the patient receives replacement donor plasma, albumin, or a combination of albumin and saline (usually 70% albumin and 30% saline).
- Donation, removing blood plasma, separating its components, and returning some of them to the same person, while holding out others to become blood products that this person donates for those in need. In such a plasma donation procedure, blood is removed from the body, blood cells and plasma are separated, and the blood cells are returned, while the plasma is collected and frozen to preserve it for eventual use as fresh frozen plasma or as an ingredient in the manufacture of blood products.

Plasmapheresis of the autologous and exchange types is used to treat a variety of disorders, including those of the immune system, such as Goodpasture's syndrome, Guillain–Barré syndrome, lupus, myasthenia gravis, and thrombotic thrombocytopenic purpura.

== Procedure ==
During plasmapheresis, blood, which consists of blood cells and a clear liquid called blood plasma, is initially taken out of the body through a needle or previously implanted catheter. Plasma is then removed from the blood by a cell separator. Three procedures are commonly used to separate the plasma from the blood cells, with each method having its own advantages and disadvantages:

- Discontinuous flow centrifugation: One venous catheter line is required. Typically, a 300 ml batch of blood is removed at a time and centrifuged to separate plasma from blood cells.
- Continuous flow centrifugation: Two venous lines are used. This method requires slightly less blood volume out of the body at any one time, as it is able to continuously spin out plasma.
- Plasma filtration: Two venous lines are used. The plasma is filtered using standard hemodialysis equipment. This continuous process requires that less than 100 ml of blood be outside the body at one time.

After plasma separation, the blood cells are returned to the person undergoing treatment, while the plasma, which contains the antibodies, is first treated and then returned to the patient in traditional plasmapheresis. Rarely, other replacement fluids, such as hydroxyethyl starch, may be used in individuals who object to blood transfusion but these are rarely used due to severe side-effects. Medication to keep the blood from clotting (an anticoagulant) is given to the patient during the procedure.

=== Complications of plasmapheresis therapy ===
Though plasmapheresis is helpful in certain medical conditions, like any other therapy, there are potential risks and complications. Insertion of a rather large intravenous catheter can lead to bleeding, lung puncture (depending on the site of catheter insertion), and, if the catheter is left in too long, it can get infected.

Aside from placing the catheter, the procedure itself has complications. When patient blood is outside of the body passing through the plasmapheresis machine, the blood has a tendency to clot. To reduce this tendency, in one common protocol, sodium citrate is infused while the blood is running through the circuit. Citrate binds to calcium in the blood, calcium being essential for blood to clot. Citrate is very effective in preventing blood from clotting; however, its use can lead to life-threateningly low calcium levels. This can be detected using the Chvostek's sign or Trousseau's sign. To prevent this complication, calcium is infused intravenously while the patient is undergoing the plasmapheresis; in addition, calcium supplementation by mouth may also be given.

Other complications include:

- Bleeding or hematoma from needle placement
- Hypotension
- Potential exposure to blood products, with risk of transfusion reactions or transfusion transmitted diseases
- Suppression of the patient's immune system

== Medical Uses ==
Plasmapheresis is used to treat certain medical conditions by removing blood plasma and substances in the blood plasma that are contributing to or causes a disease or medical condition. By removing the substances in the blood plasma and replacing the blood plasma with appropriate fluids, TPE can decease the concentrations of these substances in the patient’s blood. A nationwide hospital usage study of therapeutic plasma exchange in the United States identified approximately 106,000 hospitalizations (~17,700 annually) involving plasmapheresis between 2016 and 2021.

=== ASFA Classification of Medical Uses ===
The American Society for Apheresis (ASFA) publishes evidence-based guidelines on the usage of plasmapheresis for various disease/conditions. The ASFA guidelines apply to specific clinical indications and not the disease. Depending on the patient and their current specific medical condition and indications, different guidelines may apply.

The ASFA guidelines contain 183 categorized indications across 93 diseases/conditions divided into five categories depending on the indications with 29 Category I, 49 Category II, 102 Category III, and 3 Category IV indications. The four categories are:

Category I: Plasma exchanged is an established treatment based on the medical literature and should be the first treatment choice, either alone or in combination with other treatments.

Category II: Plasma exchanged is an established treatment based on the medical literature but should not be the first choice for treatment.

Category III: Uncertain Role (Emerging or Incomplete Evidence). There is not enough medical evidence to determine the optimal role for plasma exchange. Treatments should be decided by a doctor on a case-by-case basis.

Category IV: Treatment is ineffective or harmful. Evidence in the medical literature suggest that plasma exchange does not work for this condition or is harmful.

==== Category I: Established first-line uses ====
- Anti-NMDA receptor encephalitis
- Chronic inflammatory demyelinating polyneuropathy (CIDP)
- Guillain–Barré syndrome: Acute onset
- Hyperviscosity syndrome
- Myasthenia gravis: Acute, short-term treatment
- Thrombotic thrombocytopenic purpura (TTP)

==== Category II: Established second-line uses ====
- Granulomatosis with polyangiitis (GPA): Specified severe or refractory disease
- Kidney transplant rejection: Qualifying antibody-mediated rejection
- Multiple sclerosis: Acute attacks or relapses
- Myasthenia gravis: Long-term treatment
- PANDAS / PANS: Specified exacerbations
- Thyroid storm: Symptomatic disease

==== Category III: Uncertain role ====
- Alzheimer's disease: Mild to moderate disease.
- Goodpasture syndrome: Dialysis-dependent disease without diffuse alveolar hemorrhage
- Multiple sclerosis: Chronic primary or secondary progressive disease
- Neuromyelitis optica spectrum disorder (NMOSD): Maintenance treatment
- Pemphigus vulgaris
- Sepsis with multiorgan failure
- Toxic epidermal necrolysis (TEN): Refractory disease

==== Category IV: Ineffective or harmful ====
- Drug-induced thrombotic microangiopathy: Gemcitabine-associated or Quinine-associated
- Psoriasis: Therapeutic plasma exchange

=== Emerging and investigational applications ===
While a medical consensus exists supporting the use of TPE for certain diseases and clinical indications, as reflected in the ASFA guidelines, TPE has been investigated for several other medical and preventive health applications. The evidence supporting these applications varies considerably, and some remain experimental or have not been assigned ASFA treatment categories.

==== Alzheimer's disease ====
Several studies have investigated plasmapheresis as a potential treatment for mild to moderate Alzheimer’s disease. The proposed involves removing amyloid-beta proteins circulating in the blood plasma. TPE removes the amyloid-beta-containing blood plasma and replaces it with fresh albumin. Accordingly, the total amount of amyloid-beta proteins in the blood and possibly, in the brain may be decreased. Researchers hypothesize this can potentially reduce the formation and accumulation of amyloid plaques in the brain, which are associated with the progression of Alzheimer's disease.

The Alzheimer's Management by Albumin Replacement (AMBAR) trial is a large phase 2b/3 randomized, controlled trial of plasma exchange in Alzheimer's patients. The AMBAR trial involving 347 Alzheimer's patients and investigated plasma exchange with albumin replacement over 14 months. For the treated patients, researchers found 52% slower decline in their ability to perform everyday activities compared with the control group, which was a statistically significant difference. Patients receiving TPE also showed a reduction in cognitive decline of 66%, although this was not significantly significant result. Among patients with moderate Alzheimer's disease, performing plasma exchange was associated with 61% less decline in both cognitive performance and daily functioning, with statistically significant or borderline significant results. The researcher team concluded that TPE may slow cognitive and functional decline, but further studies are needed to confirm its effectiveness.

In 2025, a follow-up observational study involving 32 patients who were treated with plasma exchange and 194 historical controls. This study reported slower cognitive deterioration, including 45% less decline on a general cognitive assessment. However, the study was not randomized and used historical controls, limiting the conclusions that can be drawn from the study.

The 2026 ASFA guidelines classify therapeutic plasma exchange for mild to moderate Alzheimer's disease as Category III, Grade 2A, indicating that its optimal therapeutic role remains uncertain. They indicated the additional clinical trials are needed to establish its effectiveness and long-term benefits.

==== Autoimmune and inflammatory diseases ====
Under the 2026 ASFA guidelines, therapeutic plasma exchange could be used to treat certain autoimmune and inflammatory diseases. For autoimmune disorders, the rapid removal of disease-causing autoantibodies from the circulation is can be required in addition to other medical therapy. Plasma exchange therapy in and of itself is useful to temper the disease process, while simultaneous medical and immunosuppressive therapy is required for long-term management. Plasma exchange offers the quickest short-term answer to removing harmful autoantibodies; however, the production of autoantibodies by the immune system must also be suppressed, usually by the use of medications such as cyclophosphamide, cyclosporine, mycophenolate mofetil, prednisone, rituximab, or a mixture of these.

Researchers continue to investigate TPE usage for autoimmune and inflammatory conditions including postural orthostatic tachycardia syndrome (POTS), treatment-resistant rheumatoid arthritis, and persistent symptoms following COVID-19 infection. While some studies have indicated improvement in symptoms or inflammatory markers, the evidence remains limited for the other conditions and varies substantially by condition.

==== Longevity and age-related conditions ====
Researchers have also investigated plasma exchange for its potential effects on longevity and slowing biological aging. The proposed mechanism to slow or reduce biological ageing involves using plasmapheresis to remove or dilute circulating proteins, inflammatory molecules, and other factors in a person’s blood plasma that accumulate or change with age. Researchers have proposed removing or diluting these factors can potentially decrease age-related cellular dysfunction.

In a 2020 study, researchers replaced half the blood plasma of older mice with saline and albumin, which improved muscle regeneration, reduced liver fat accumulation and fibrosis, and increased the production of new neurons in the brain. A randomized, placebo-controlled study involving 42 adults over the age of 50 in 2025 found that plasma exchange produced statistically significant changes in fifteen epigenetic aging clocks compared with placebo, with the largest estimated reduction in biological age of approximately 2.6 years.

The 2026 ASFA guidelines considered the use of plasma exchange for longevity and anti-aging but did not assign a treatment category, citing insufficient evidence that the procedure produces meaningful improvements in clinical outcomes.

==== Microplastics and environmental contaminants ====
Microplastics are small plastic particles that can enter the human body through food, water, inhalation and other means. These particles have been found in human blood and tissues. Because plasma exchange blood plasma, researchers have posited that TPE can reduce the concentration of microplastic particles in the blood.

In 2026, the Journal of Clinical Apheresis published a study that measured microplastic levels before and after 174 plasma exchange procedures involving 114 patients. For patients with higher levels of initial microplastic concentrations (at least 30 particles per 100 microliters of blood), researchers found an average reduction of approximately 60% of microplastics levels in the blood after TPE. However, the research also observed that patients with low initial concentrations had on average a higher microplastic levels after treatment. This increase in microplastic particles in the initial low concentration patients was potentially caused by plastic particles released from the tubing and other equipment used during the procedure. The study did not conclude whether TPE reduced circulating microplastics in other tissues or produces measurable health benefits. This study also used a different technique than other studies to measure microplastic density making it harder to compare their results to other microplastic studies or determine where an average person falls on the scale used to measure microplastic density in this study.

The 2026 ASFA guidelines did not assign a treatment category for microplastic removal, citing insufficient evidence of meaningful clinical benefits.

=== Outpatient and elective applications ===
Depending on a patient’s condition and treatment needs, plasmapheresis can be performed in a hospital setting or in outpatient medical facilities. Historically, TPE has been primarily provided in a hospital setting. In recent years, private medical clinics have increased offered plasmapheresis, especially for elective treatments such as longevity, preventive health, and wellness applications.

In the United States, TPE at hospitals is typically performed to treat an acute or ongoing medical condition. U.S. health insurance generally covers plasmapheresis treatment only when considered medically necessary, with insurers often looking to the ASFA guidelines to help determine coverage. Private medical facilities offer elective TPE to individuals without a specific disease requiring treatment as well as patients with diagnosed medical conditions. TPE procedures are often provided as part of longevity and preventive health programs intended to reduce circulating inflammatory substances, environmental contaminants, and other factors associated with aging.

When plasmapheresis is performed, whether in a hospital or outpatient medical facility, specialized equipment, trained medical personnel, and monitoring for potential complications are required. Suitability for outpatient treatment depends on the condition being treated and the patient's overall health.

== Plasma donation ==
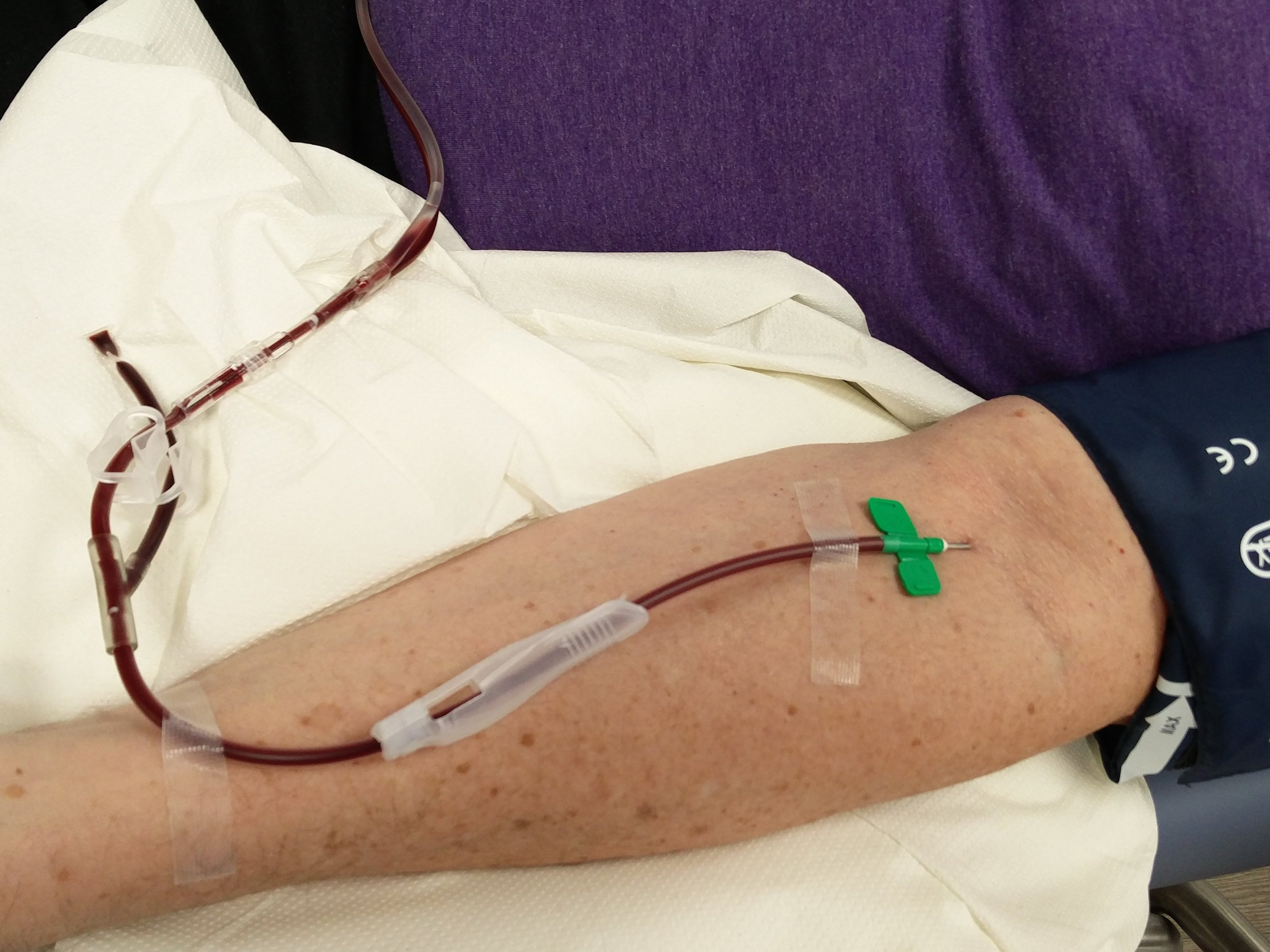
Plasma donation uses two lines – a single needle connects to one line that splits into an outgoing line and a return line. A spur can also be seen that is used for collecting test samples of the whole blood.

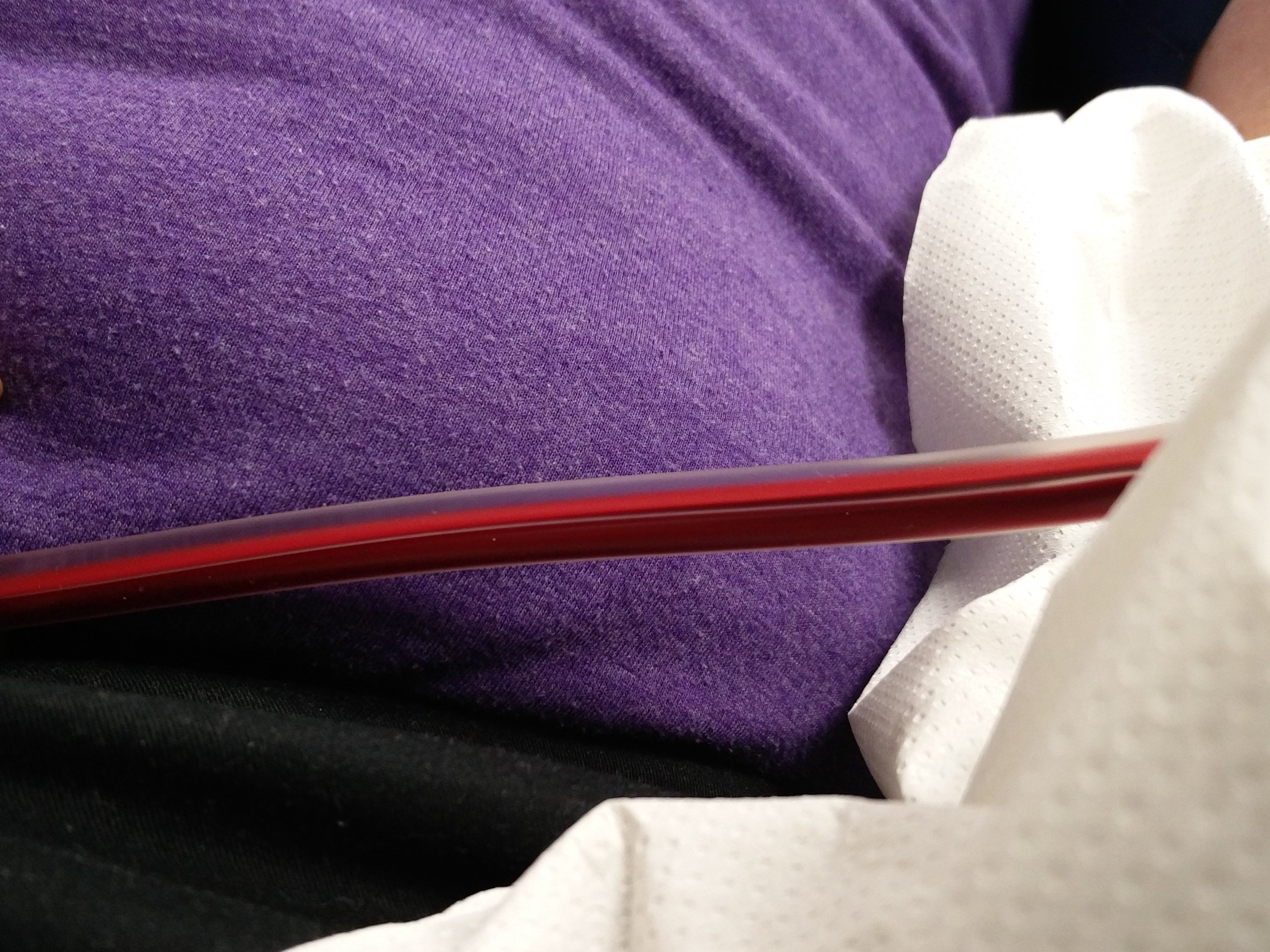
Detail shows the process as the return line is filling for the first time

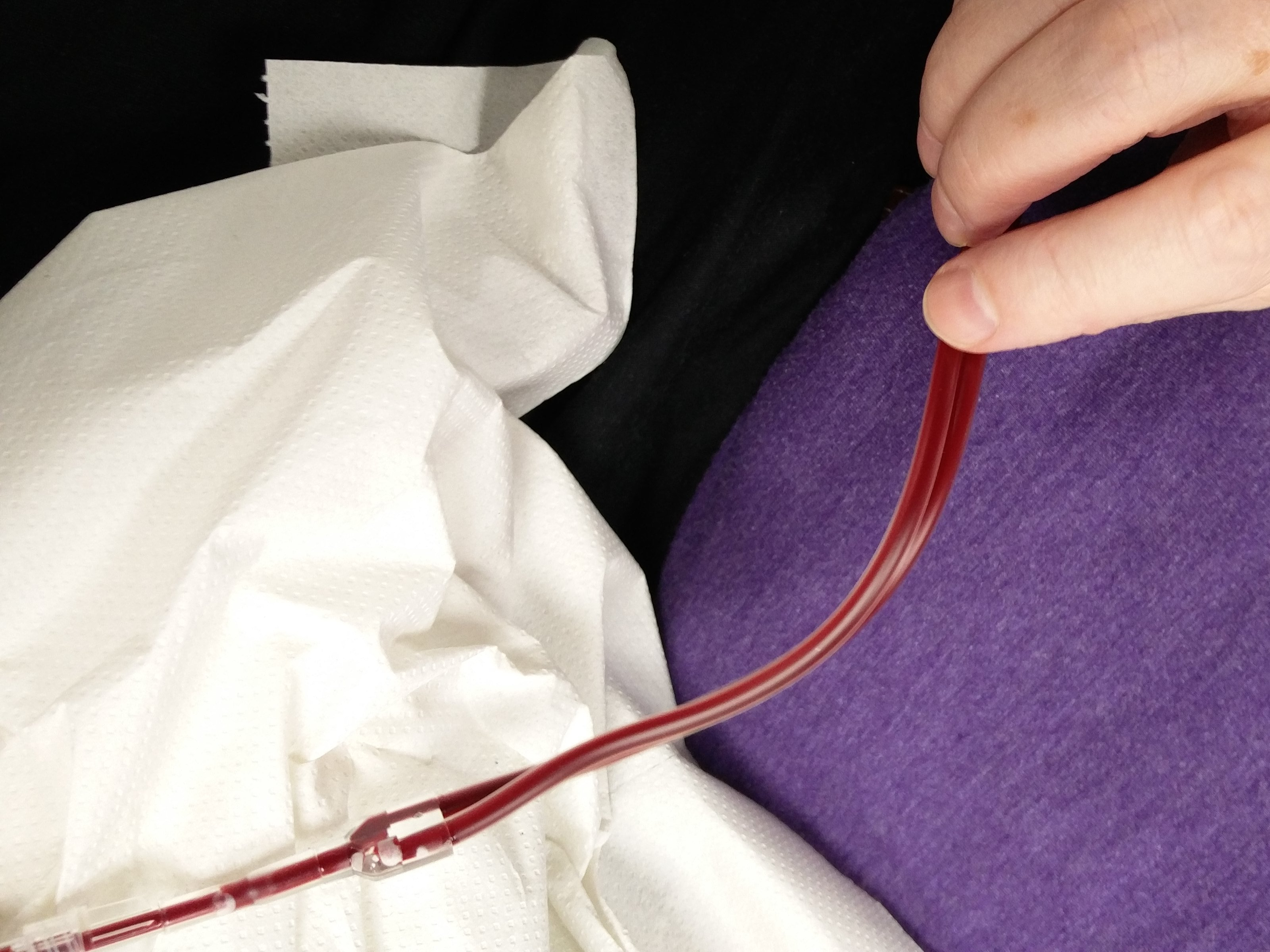
Detail shows the process when the return line is full

Donating plasma is similar in many ways to whole blood donation, though the end product is used for different purposes. Most plasmapheresis is for fractionation into other products; other blood donations are transfused with relatively minor modifications. Plasma that is collected solely for further manufacturing is called Source Plasma.

Plasma donors undergo a screening process to ensure both the donor's safety and the safety of the collected product. Factors monitored include blood pressure, pulse, temperature, total protein, protein electrophoresis, health history screening similar to that for whole blood, as well as an annual physical exam with a licensed physician or an approved physician substitute under the supervision of the physician. Donors are screened at each donation for viral diseases that can be transmitted by blood, sometimes by multiple methods. For example, donations are tested for HIV by ELISA, which shows if they have been exposed to the disease, as well as by nucleic acid methods (PCR or similar) to rule out recent infections that the ELISA test might miss and are also screened for hepatitis B and hepatitis C. Industry standards require at least two sets of negative test results before the collected plasma is used for injectable products. The plasma is also treated in processing multiple times to inactivate any virus that was undetected during the screening process.

In a few countries, plasma (like blood) is donated by unpaid volunteers. In others, including the United States, Austria, Germany and some Canadian facilities plasma donors are paid for their donations. Standards for donating plasma are set by national regulatory agencies such as the U.S. Food and Drug Administration (FDA), the European Union, and by a professional organization, the Plasma Protein Therapeutics Association (or PPTA), which audits and accredits collection facilities. A National Donor Deferral Registry (NDDR) is also maintained by the PPTA for use in keeping donors with prior positive viral antibody test results from donating at any facility.

Almost all plasmapheresis in the US is performed by automated methods. In some cases, automated plasmapheresis is used to collect plasma products like fresh frozen plasma for direct transfusion purposes, often at the same time as plateletpheresis. These procedures are performed at facilities such as community blood centers.

Since returning red cells causes the body to replace plasma more rapidly, a donor can provide up to a liter of plasma at a time and can donate with only a few days between donations, unlike the 56-day deferral for blood donation. The amount allowed in a donation varies vastly from country to country, but generally does not exceed two donations, each as much as a liter (one-third of the total plasma volume), per seven-day period. If a significant amount of red blood cells cannot be returned, the donor may not donate for 56 days, just as if they had donated a unit of blood. Depending on the collection system and the operation, the removed plasma may be replaced by saline. The body typically replaces the collected volume within 24 hours, and donors typically donate up to twice a week, though this varies by country.

The collected plasma is promptly frozen at lower than -20 °C (-4 °F) and is typically shipped to a processing facility for fractionation. This process separates the collected plasma into specific components, such as albumin and immunoglobulins, most of which are made into medications for human use. Sometimes the plasma is thawed and transfused as Fresh Frozen Plasma (FFP), much like the plasma from a normal blood donation.

Manual method
For the manual method, approximately the same as a whole blood donation is collected from the donor. The collected blood is then separated by centrifuge machines in separate rooms, the plasma is pressed out of the collection set into a satellite container, and the red blood cells are returned to the donor.
The danger with this method was that if the wrong red blood cells were returned to the donor, a serious and potentially fatal transfusion reaction could occur. Requiring donors to recite their names and ID numbers on returned bags of red cells minimized this risk. This procedure has largely become obsolete in favor of the automated method.
Automated method

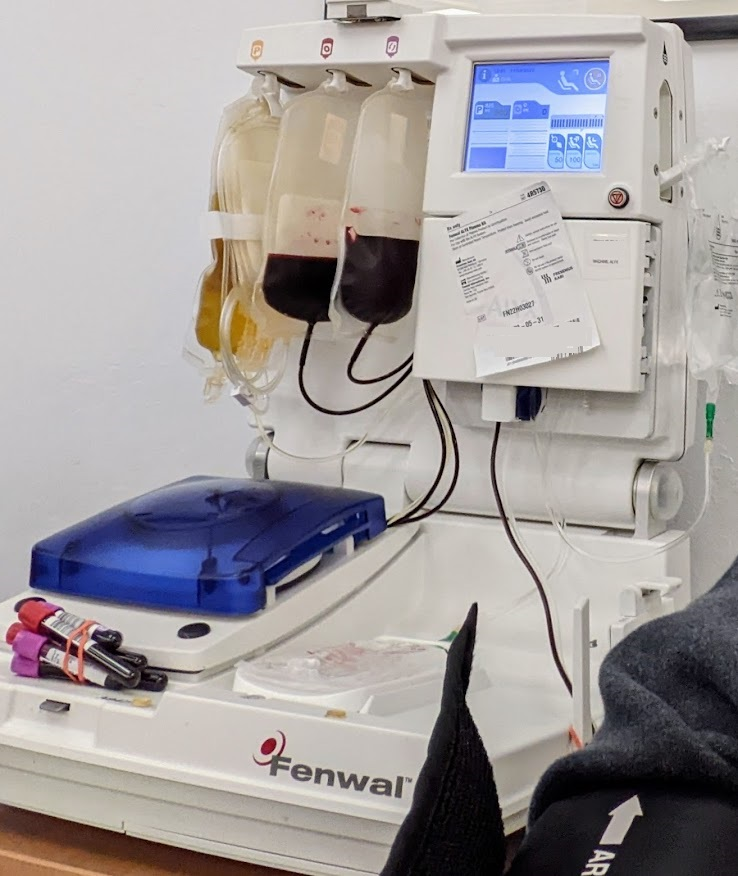
An Erythropheresis machine being used for plasmapheresis

The automated method uses a very similar process. The difference is that the collection, separation, and return are all performed inside a machine connected to the donor through a needle in the arm, typically the antecubital vein. There is no risk of receiving the wrong red cells. The devices used are very similar to the devices used for therapeutic plasmapheresis, and the potential for citrate toxicity is similar. The potential risks are explained to prospective donors at the first donation, and most donors tolerate the procedure well. In the UK in 2020, plasma donation is sought from volunteers who have recovered from COVID-19.

Antibodies
Donors are sometimes immunized against agents such as tetanus or hepatitis B so that their plasma contains the antibodies against the toxin or disease. In other donors, an intentionally incompatible unit of blood is transfused to produce antibodies to the antigens on the red cells. The collected plasma then contains these components, which are used in manufacturing of medications. Donors who are already ill may have their plasma collected for use as a positive control for laboratory testing.

== History ==
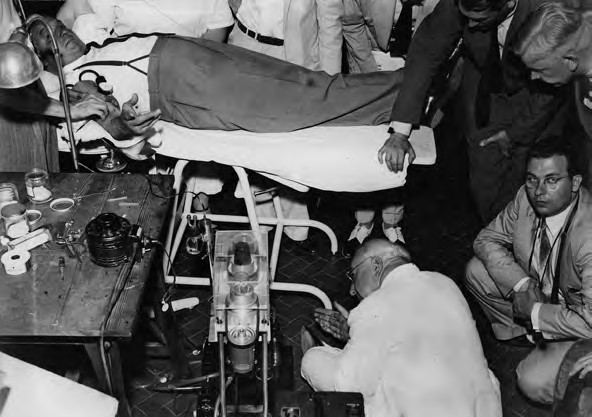
Edwin J. Cohn & Josep Antoni Grífols i Roig at the 4th International Congress of Blood Transfusion, Lisbon, 1951

Plasmapheresis was originally described by doctors Vadim A. Yurevick and Nicolay Rosenberg of the Imperial Medical and Surgical Academy of Saint Petersburg in 1913. and John Abel and Leonard Rowntree of Johns Hopkins Hospital in 1914. Both studies carried out on animals, are considered precedent to subsequent studies held in humans and offered the first description of the technique. The first studies of the effects of plasmapheresis on humans were undertaken during the WWII period, and the results were reported in a study over six plasma donors presented by doctors Co Tui, F.C. Bartter and A.M. Wright in 1944.

Aware of the rising demand for plasma for transfusion, Dr. Josep Antoni Grífols-Lucas conducted the first systematic study of the application of plasmapheresis in a series of plasma donors. Performed in 1951, this was the most exhaustive study to date of the medium-term effects on the human body, and involved more than 320 plasmapheresis procedures. Grifols-Lucas concluded that it was possible for donors to undergo plasmapheresis on a weekly basis without the quality of their plasma suffering, while the method also made it possible to obtain a larger quantity of plasma when compared to the conventional method of whole blood donation. The results of the study were presented at the 4th International Congress of Blood Transfusion in Lisbon (1951), and were published in 1952 in the British Medical Journal and Medicina Clínica in Spain.

At the Lisbon congress, Grifols-Lucas met Edwin Cohn. While Grifols-Lucas was presenting a safe technique for obtaining large quantities of plasma from healthy donors, Cohn presented a plasma fractionator, a device that separated out the proteins contained in plasma. These two major contributions marked the birth of a new industry: plasma fractionation to obtain plasma products. In 1955, further data were presented at the 5th Congress of the European Hematology Society, in Freiburg, Germany, based on the ongoing performance of plasmapheresis over a five-year period. In 1956 Grifols-Lucas presented the results at the 6th Congress of the International Hematology Society in Boston, US.

Michael Rubinstein was the first to use plasmapheresis to treat an immune-related disorder when he saved the life of an adolescent boy with thrombotic thrombocytopenic purpura (TTP) at the Cedars of Lebanon Hospital in Los Angeles in 1959. The modern plasmapheresis process itself originated in the U.S. National Cancer Institute between 1963 and 1968, where investigators drew upon an old dairy creamer separation technology first used in 1878 and refined by Edwin Cohn's centrifuge marketed in 1953.

In 1965, Dr. Víctor Grifols-Lucas, brother of Josep Antoni Grifols-Lucas, patented the device, along with the procedure for performing plasmapheresis in situ, that is, with the donor present. This replaced a fragmented, manual process with a continuous automatic method which enabled blood components to be extracted, separated and returned to the donor in a single procedure. The new device made plasmapheresis faster and simpler, and also made it safer for donors.

== See also ==
- Apheresis
- Hemodialysis
- Leukoreduction
- Venipuncture
