= Subroto Das (doctor) =

Indian medical doctor

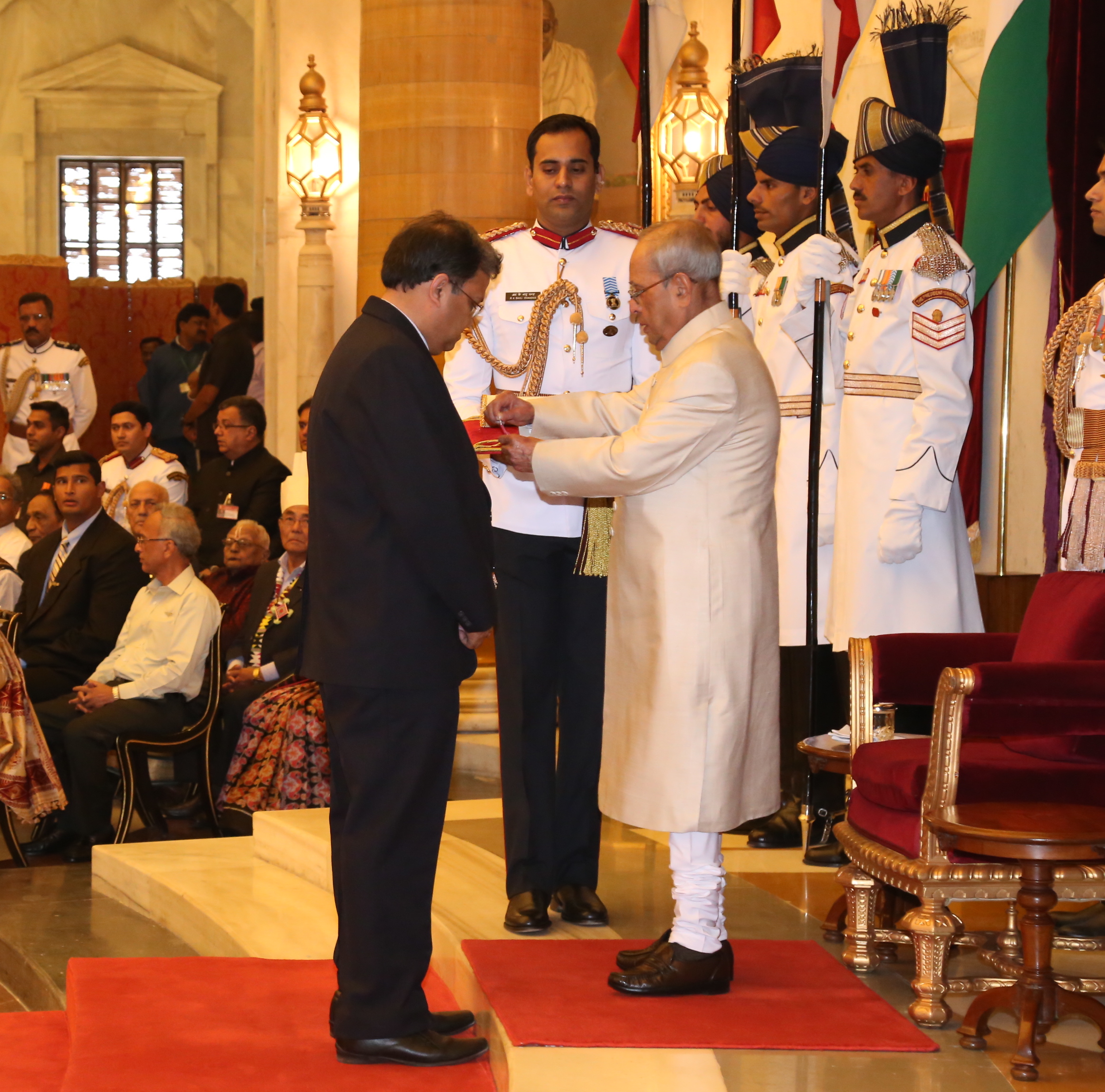
- Dr Subroto Das being conferred the Padma Shri Award by the former President of India, Shri Pranab Mukherjee. April, 2017
- Born: 20 January 1965 (age 61); Kolkata, India
- Other name: Subrato Das
- Education: Baroda Medical College, Maharaja Sayajirao University of Baroda (MBBS); Tata Institute of Social Sciences (PGDip)
- Organisation(s): Lifeline Foundation Vadodara; Baroda Life Management; Medicare Consultancies
- Known for: Emergency Medical Services; Highway EMS; Emergency Medicine; Occupational Health
- Spouse: Sushmita Das
- Children: 1
- Awards: Padma Shri (2017); Reliance Industries CNN-IBN Real Heroes Award (2008); Prince Michael International Road Safety Award (2004); Red & White Bravery Gold Awards (now: Godfrey Phillips National Bravery Awards (2003)
- Honours: Eisenhower Fellowship; Ashoka Fellowship
- Website: www.emsindia.in

Dr Subroto Das is an Indian physician who works in Highway Trauma Care and Emergency Medical Services (EMS) in South Asia and received the Padma Shri, one of India's civilian awards. He co-founded Lifeline Foundation with his wife, Sushmita, following their survival of an accident in August 1999 on National Highway 8. The foundation addresses highway fatalities in India, which number over 150,000 annually. He serves as the Chief Executive Officer of Lifeline Foundation Vadodara.

Das received the Asian EMS Lifetime Achievement Award from the Asian EMS Council. According to The Times of India, he is recognized as an EMS expert in India.

== Early life and education ==
Subroto was born to a Bengali family in Kolkata, India. His father, Dr. Chitta Ranjan Das, was a Chief Scientist and Glass Technologist with Yera Glass, Alembic Group, in Vadodara and his mother Maya Das, has been a homemaker. Das grew up in Vadodara and attended the Rosary High School.

He graduated with bachelor's in medicine and surgery (MBBS) from the Baroda Medical College, Maharaja Sayajirao University of Baroda in 1984. Following this, he did a postgraduate diploma in hospital management from the Tata Institute of Social Sciences in Mumbai.

He married Sushmita in 1991.

== Works ==
In August 1999, Subroto and Sushmita had a massive road traffic accident on National Highway 8 connecting Delhi to Mumbai. They sustained multiple injuries and were stranded on the highway without any assistance or medical aid for over four and half hours.

Having survived a major road traffic accident with delayed bystander intervention and profound trauma, Dr Das and his wife Sushmita established Lifeline Foundation in 2002 and began integrating available resources and created a network of ambulances, cranes, metal cutters, hospitals and blood banks across the national and state highways. The foundation established a 24-hour control room for victims or bystanders to call. And in 2002, launched India's first Accident Helpline Services across 263 kilometres of National Highway 8 (India, old numbering) between Ahmedabad and Surat in the state of Gujarat.

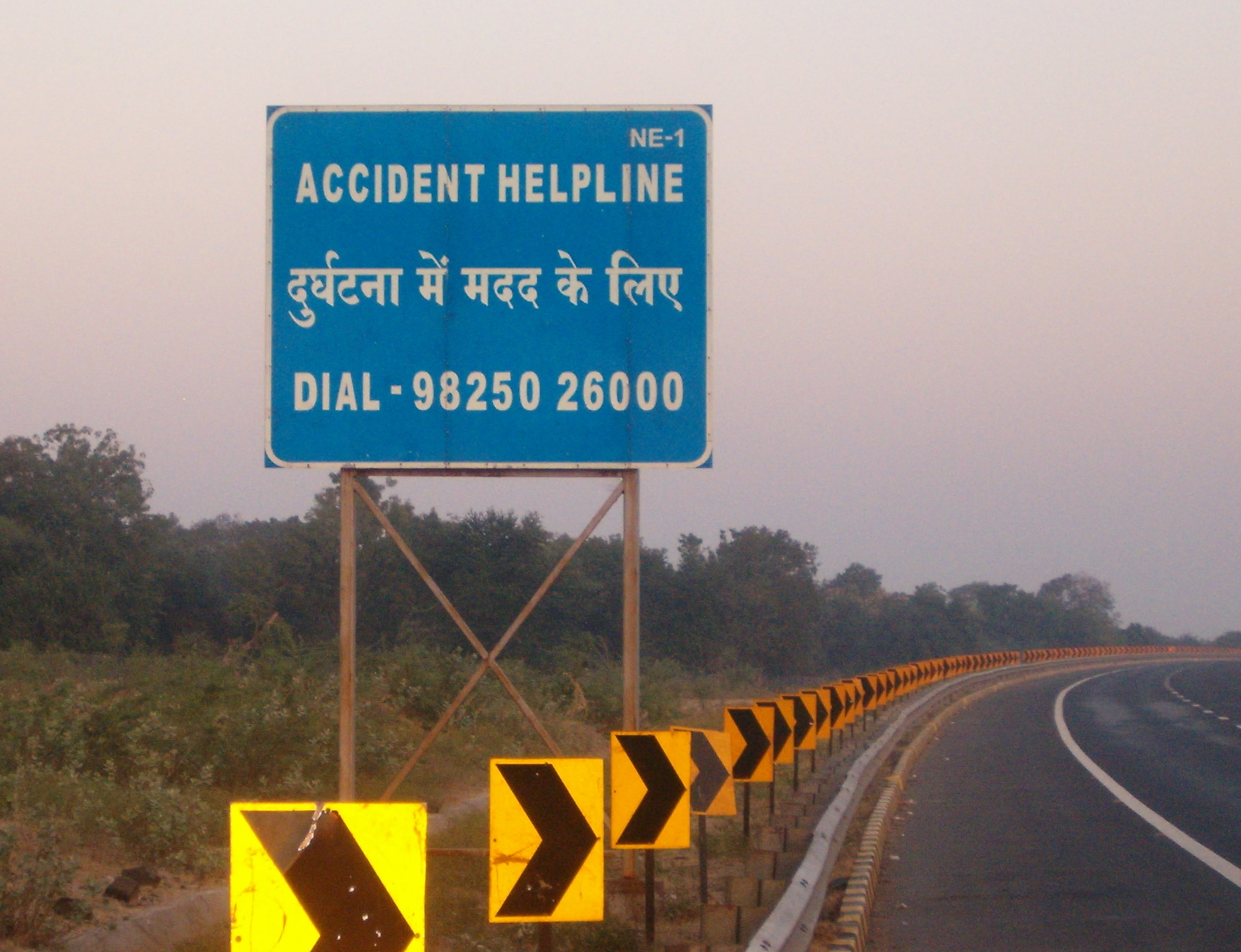
Accident Helpline board on National Expressway 1

He collaborated with Nobel Laureate Muhammad Yunus to conceptualize boat ambulance services for the riverine delta regions of Bangladesh, aiming to improve emergency care access and evacuation following natural disasters.

Das gave a TED talk about his journey and his work at a TED conference organised by the Indian Institute of Management Ranchi in 2013.

For his services to the field of medicine through his foundation, Das was conferred with the Padma Shri award in 2017 by then President of India, Pranab Mukherjee.

== Organisational Impact ==
According to an impact assessment study conducted by the Tata Institute of Social Sciences and Axis Bank Foundation in 2015, released by then Union Minister of State for Finance Jayant Sinha, Lifeline Foundation developed a highway rescue response model that was among those used in designing EMS services in India. The study noted that the foundation worked on utilizing existing healthcare infrastructure and coordinating with emergency rescue departments. In 2007, Gujarat became the first state in India to pass Emergency Medical Services legislation, with Lifeline Foundation participating in the process.

== Writings and editorial work ==
Dr Das authored a book, Prepare to Respond on the challenges of reconstruction of Sri Lankan emergency and disaster management services post the Tsunami.

In 2024, he co-edited BMC@75: A Legacy of Learning and Healing, a commemorative coffee table book published by the Baroda Medical College Alumni Association (BMCAA) to mark the 75th anniversary of the college.

Das served as chief editor of EMSIndia®, a peer-reviewed journal on EMS. He was also the founding editor of the Asian EMS Journal, published by the Singapore based Asian Association of EMS.

== In popular culture ==
BBC featured him in its award-winning series "Health Matters"

Doordarshan featured his work and that of his wife, Sushmita, in a documentary in 2009. Doordarshan also featured his work in their program, Aaj Savere in October 2017.

His work has been profiled in Sony Television’s KBC on 27 October 2017.

He finished Zonal 2nd runners up in The Times of India’s reality program – Lead India in 2007.
