= Rajalakshmi (disambiguation) =

Rajalakshmi (1930–1965) was a Malayalam writer and poet in India

Rajalakshmi may also refer to:

== Colleges ==
- Rajalakshmi Engineering College, Thandalam, Chennai, Tamil Nadu, India, an Engineering College

== People ==
- Rajalakshmi Parthasarathy (born 1925), Indian journalist, educationist and social worker
- Rajalakshmy (born 1983), Malayalee playback singer
- Rajalakshmi (actress), Telugu actress who acted in all South Indian languages, Sankarabharanam fame
- R. Rajalakshmi (disambiguation)
  - R. Rajalakshmi (politician), Indian politician
  - R. Rajalakshmi (scientist) (1926–2007), Indian biochemist and nutritionist
- T. P. Rajalakshmi (1911–1964), Tamil and Telugu film heroine, director, and producer

== Organisations ==
- Sri Raja-Lakshmi Foundation, Indian Charitable Trust
