= Om Dutt Gulati =

Indian pharmacologist

Om Datt Gulati
- Born: 31 January 1927; India
- Died: 23 February 2012 (aged 85)
- Education: University of Madras; Agra University; University of Colorado
- Known for: Studies on Autonomic Pharmacology
- Awards: 1971 Shanti Swarup Bhatnagar Prize; 1973 NAMS Shriram Gold Medal; 1978 Amrut Modi Research Foundation Award; 1981 B. C. Roy Award; IPS Uvunas Prize
- Scientific career
- Fields: Pharmacology
- Workplaces: Baroda Medical College; Pramukhswami Medical College; Ambalal Sarabhai Enterprises

Om Datt Gulati (31 January 1927 – 23 February 2012) was an Indian pharmacologist and the Dean of the Department of pharmacology at Baroda Medical College. Known for his researches in autonomic pharmacology, he was also a professor at Pramukhswami Medical College, Anand and an honorary fellow of the Indian Pharmaceutical Society. The Council of Scientific and Industrial Research, the apex agency of the Government of India for scientific research, awarded him the Shanti Swarup Bhatnagar Prize for Science and Technology, one of the highest Indian science awards for his contributions to Medical Sciences in 1971. (Note: Long link - please select award year to see details) He received the B. C. Roy Award, the highest Indian medical award, in 1981.

== Biography ==
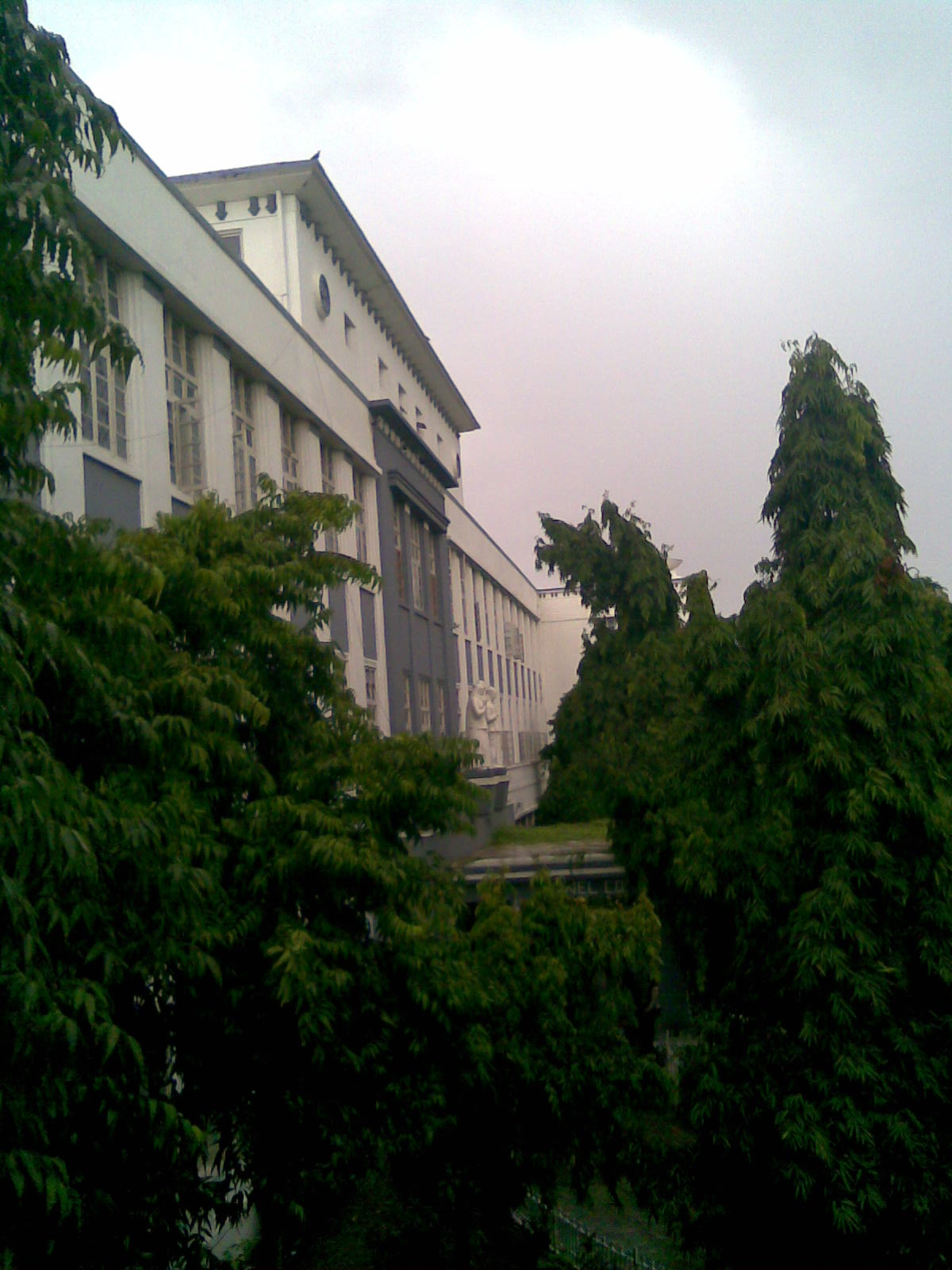
Baroda Medical College

Om Datt Gulati, born on 31 January 1927, graduated in medicine from the University of Madras and after earning an MD in pharmacology from Agra University, moved to the University of Colorado Boulder from where he secured an MS. Returning to India, he joined Baroda Medical College where he spent whole of his regular career and held the post of a Dean at the time of his superannuation in 1985. Post-retirement, he joined Pramukhswami Medical College, in Anand, Gujarat as a professor before associating himself with Ambalal Sarabhai Enterprise, Baroda as a consultant and director.

Gulati was one of the founders of the Indian Pharmacological Society, served as its president and held its life membership. He pioneered the academic studies on autonomic pharmacology in India and mentored several master's and doctoral scholars of the subject. His endothelin-based researches during his days in the US elucidated the physiological role played by the peptides and widened the understanding of its effects on the sympathetic nervous system, central cardiovascular system and pathogenesis of hypertension. He was also known to have done extensive studies on the adrenergic mechanisms. He documented his researches by way of over 135 articles in per-reviewed journals (Note: Please see Selected bibliography section) and his work has been cited by a number of authors and researchers. The award orations delivered by him include the B. N. Ghosh Oration of the Indian Pharmacological Society in 1982 and the Golden Jubilee Lecture of the National Academy of Medical Sciences in 2011

Gulati died on 23 February 2012, at the age of 85.

== Awards and honors ==
The Council of Scientific and Industrial Research awarded Gulati Shanti Swarup Bhatnagar Prize, one of the highest Indian science awards in 1971. He received the Shriram Gold Medal of the National Academy of Medical Sciences in 1973 and the Amrut Modi Research Foundation Award in 1978. The Medical Council of India awarded him the B. C. Roy Award, the highest Indian honor inn the medical sciences category, in 1981. he is also a recipient of the Uvunas Prize of the Indian Pharmacological Society. Indian Pharmacological Society has instituted an annual oration, O. D. Gulati Oration and Indian Journal of Pharmacology awards O. D. Gulati Prize Paper Abstracts every year in his honor.

== Selected bibliography ==
- Nandkumar S. Shah, Om Datt Gulati (1984). "Effect of clozapine and molindone on plasma and brain levels of mescaline in mice". European Journal of Drug Metabolism and Pharmacokinetics. 9 (4): 307–309. doi:10.1007/BF03189681. PMID 6532803. S2CID 6615255.
- Rajani AP, Gulati OD (1988). "Evidence for multiple prejunctional receptor sites in rat isolated anococcygeus muscle". Arch Int Pharmacodyn Ther. 292: 86–100. PMID 3395178.
- Sethi OP, Anand KK, Gulati OD (1992). "Evaluation of xanthotoxol for central nervous system activity". J. Ethnopharmacol. 36 (3): 239–47. doi:10.1016/0378-8741(92)90050-2. PMID 1434683.
- Bhugra P, Gulati OD (1996). "Interaction of calcium channel blockers with different agonists in aorta from normal and diseased rats". Indian J Physiol Pharmacol. 40 (2): 109–19. PMID 9062804.
- Bhugra P, Gulati OD (2001). "Influence of chronic treatment of rats with isoprenaline and calcium channel blockers on response of isolated right ventricle to noradrenaline". Indian J Exp Biol. 39 (3): 272–5. PMID 11495288.
