= Llorach (surname) =

Llorach is a surname. Notable people with the surname include:

- Alfred Benlloch Llorach (1917–2013), Spanish inventor
- Eva Llorach (born 1979), Spanish actress
- Gaëtan Llorach (born 1974), French alpine skier

== See also ==
- Llorac, a rural municipality and village in Catalonia, Spain
