= Lifeline Foundation Vadodara =

Indian emergency medical services non-profit organization

Lifeline Foundation
- Formation: 01 July, 2002
- Founders: Dr Subroto Das and Sushmita Das
- Type: Non-governmental organization
- Purpose: Emergency medical services, trauma care, first aid training
- Location: Vadodara, Gujarat, India
- Region served: India
- Website: Official Website

Lifeline Foundation is a Vadodara-based nonprofit organisation focusing on emergency medical services, highway trauma care, and first aid training. The foundation was established in 2002 by Dr Subroto Das and Sushmita Das following a life-threatening road accident.

== Highway Rescue Project ==
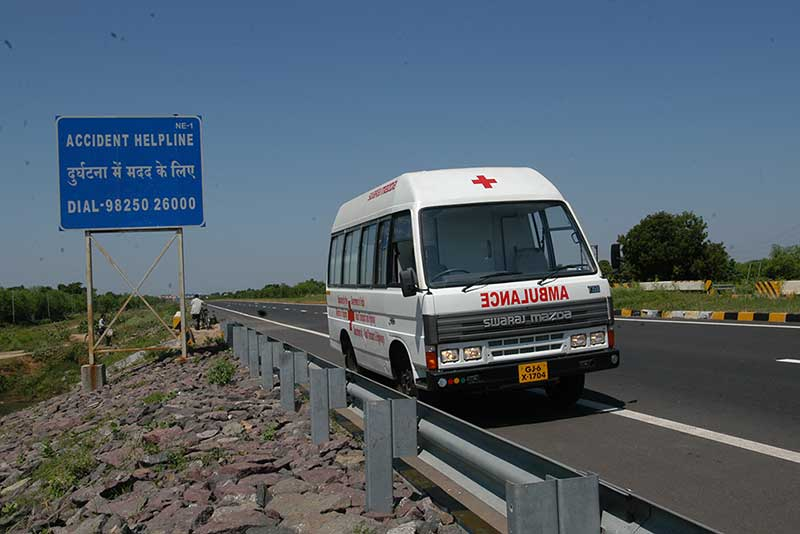
An example of the boards on National and State highways set up by the Lifeline Foundation under its Highway Rescue Project.

The foundation's initial initiative was the Highway Rescue Project. After experiencing a severe road accident with delayed medical intervention, the founders established a network of ambulances, cranes, hospitals, and blood banks along national and state highways. In 2002, they launched an Accident Helpline Service initially covering 263 kilometres of National Highway 8 between Ahmedabad and Surat in Gujarat.

The project was subsequently integrated into the disaster mitigation plans of the Gujarat State Disaster Management Authority and expanded to include highways in Rajasthan, Maharashtra, Kerala, and West Bengal.

== Public Health Initiatives ==
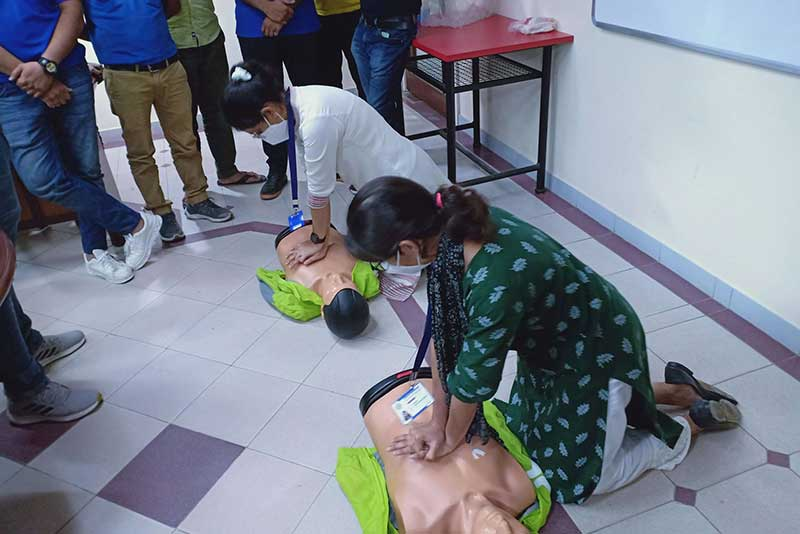
A bystander cardiopulmonary resuscitation (CPR) training session being conducted by the Lifeline Foundation.

Lifeline Foundation conducts community-based public health interventions, including training citizens in Vadodara in cardiopulmonary resuscitation (CPR) and basic first aid. This initiative has involved training traffic attendants, airport officials, transport personnel, and staff of the Vadodara Municipal Corporation.

== Recognition ==
In 2015, the Tata Institute of Social Sciences published an impact assessment study noting the foundation's role in developing highway rescue response models in India.

For his work through the foundation, co-founder Dr. Subroto Das was awarded the Padma Shri in 2017 by the Government of India. The foundation was also featured on the television program Kaun Banega Crorepati in 2017.
