= R. Rajalakshmi =

R. Rajalakshmi may refer to:

- R. Rajalakshmi (politician), Indian politician
- R. Rajalakshmi (scientist) (1926–2007), Indian biochemist and nutritionist
