= Lalita Ramakrishnan =

Indian-American microbiologist

Lalita Ramakrishnan FRS FMedSci
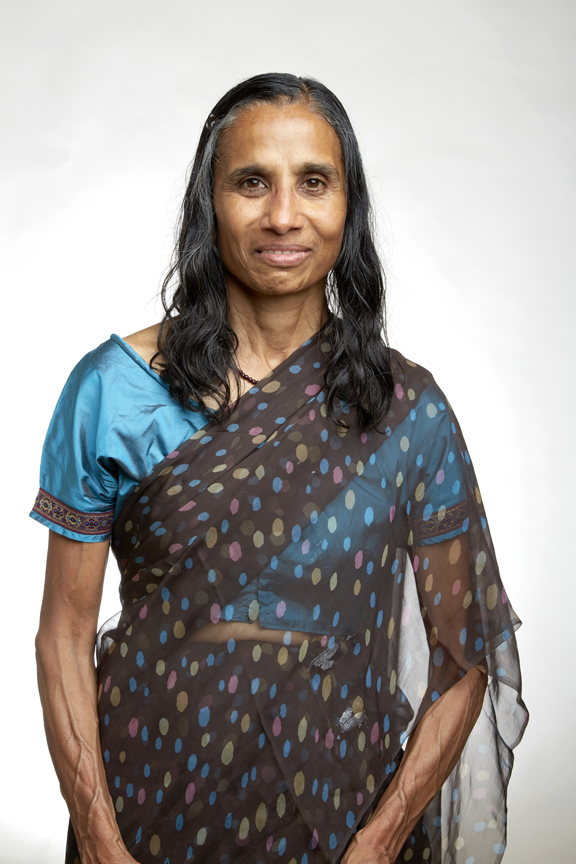
- Ramakrishnan in 2018
- Born: 1959 (age 66–67); Baroda, Gujarat, India
- Education: Baroda Medical College; Tufts University
- Spouse: Mark Troll
- Mother: Rajalakshmi Ramakrishnan
- Relatives: Venki Ramakrishnan (brother)
- Awards: Member of the National Academy of Sciences (2015); EMBO Member (2019)
- Scientific career
- Fields: Microbiology; Immunology; Infectious diseases
- Workplaces: University of Cambridge; University of Washington
- Thesis: Abelson virus-transformed cells as models of early B lymphocyte differentiation (1990)
- Website: www.med.cam.ac.uk/ramakrishnan/

Lalita Ramakrishnan (born 1959) is an Indian-born American microbiologist who is known for her contributions to the understanding of the biological mechanism of tuberculosis. As of 2019 she serves as a professor of Immunology and Infectious Diseases at the University of Cambridge, where she is also a Wellcome Trust Principal Research Fellow and a practicing physician. Her research is conducted at the MRC Laboratory of Molecular Biology (MRC LMB), where she serves as the Head of the Molecular Immunity Unit of the Department of Medicine embedded at the MRC LMB. Working with Stanley Falkow at Stanford, she developed the strategy of using Mycobacterium marinum infection as a model for tuberculosis. Her work has appeared in a number of journals, including Science, Nature, and Cell. In 2018 and 2019 Ramakrishnan coauthored two influential papers in the British Medical Journal (BMJ) arguing that the widely accepted estimates of the prevalence of latent tuberculosis—estimates used as a basis for allocation of research funds—are far too high. She is married to Mark Troll, a physical chemist.

== Early life and education ==
Ramakrishnan was born in 1959 in Baroda (now Vadodara) and grew up there. Her parents were both scientists as is her brother, Nobel laureate Venki Ramakrishnan. When Ramakrishnan was a child, her mother had three bouts of spinal tuberculosis.

As a high school student, Ramakrishnan excelled at math and physics. Ramakrishnan began attending medical school at age 17, which is "not atypical in India, where specialized training begins shortly after high school." In 1983, she graduated with a Bachelor of Medicine degree in Vadodara from Baroda Medical College.

After taking an elective course in advanced immunology, Ramakrishnan decided to study immunology. In 1990, she graduated from Tufts University with a PhD in Immunology. She then became the first foreign graduate of the medical residency program at Tufts-New England Medical Center. After completing a fellowship in Infectious Diseases at the University of California at San Francisco hospitals, including San Francisco General Hospital (now Zuckerberg San Francisco General Hospital and Trauma Center), Ramakrishnan completed postdoctoral work in Stanley Falkow's lab at Stanford University, where she developed the strategy of using Mycobacterium marinum infection in zebrafish as a model for tuberculosis.

== Career and research ==
In 2001, Ramakrishnan joined the faculty of the University of Washington, where she worked both as a basic scientist and infectious diseases physician. While at the University of Washington, she pioneered the study of tuberculosis in zebrafish as a close approximation to tuberculosis in humans. This strategy led to a fundamental new biological understanding of how disease develops. Zebrafish larvae are optically transparent and lend themselves to genetic manipulation; by infecting them with their natural pathogen, Mycobacterium marinum, a bacterium that causes tuberculosis in fish and is a close genetic relative of the bacteria that cause tuberculosis in humans, she could carefully track the infection while manipulating the genes of both the larvae and the bacteria. This approach "enabled a detailed dissection of granuloma formation" (a granuloma is a structure of the immune system made up principally of cells, called macrophages, that ingest bacteria and other foreign particles). In 2010, Ramakrishnan was the senior author of a study which was published as the cover story of Cell.

In 2014, Ramakrishnan joined the faculty of the University of Cambridge as a principal research fellow for the Wellcome Trust and Professor of Immunology and Infectious Diseases. Work in Seattle, and subsequently in Cambridge, led to the discovery of the molecular and cellular details of mycobacterial and host interactions at each step of infection. This yielded fundamental insights that suggest entirely new approaches to treat tuberculosis. Ramakrishnan and her research group showed that two lipids (a type of fatty molecule) on the surface of the mycobacteria work together to enable the bacteria to initially avoid the macrophages that would kill them and instead enter macrophages that provide them a niche for growth. She found that the bacteria then stimulate the formation of granulomas that provide them a safe harbour, in contrast to the normal role of granulomas in protecting the host from the bacteria. Later the infected macrophages in the granulomas die, and this accelerates bacterial growth and promotes the development of the disease. These findings led to host-targeting therapies that show promise in tuberculosis patients. Ramakrishnan and her group tackled the problem of drug tolerance in tuberculosis, and found a drug that inhibits the development of resistance to the standard drugs used to treat the disease.

Ramakrishnan later exploited the zebrafish to study leprosy, another devastating disease with morbid neurological consequences. She showed that a Mycobacterium leprae lipid causes nerve damage by inciting abnormal responses in the macrophages.

In addition to basic science investigations, Ramakrishnan, along with Marcel Behr and Paul Edelstein, reviewed studies concerning the concept of latent tuberculosis in order to determine whether tuberculosis-infected persons have life-long infection capable of causing disease at any future time. These studies, both published in the British Medical Journal (BMJ), show that the incubation period of tuberculosis is short, usually within months after infection, and very rarely more than 2 years after infection. They also show that more than 90% of people infected with M. tuberculosis for more than two years never develop tuberculosis even if their immune system is severely suppressed. Immunologic tests for tuberculosis infection such as the tuberculin skin test and interferon gamma release assays (IGRA) only indicate past infection, with the majority of previously infected persons no longer capable of developing tuberculosis. Ramakrishnan told the New York Times that researchers "have spent hundreds of millions of dollars chasing after latency, but the whole idea that a quarter of the world is infected with TB is based on a fundamental misunderstanding."

The first BMJ article about latency was accompanied by an editorial written by Soumya Swaminathan, Deputy Director-General of the World Health Organization, who endorsed the findings and called for more funding of TB research directed at the most heavily afflicted parts of the world, rather than disproportionate attention to a relatively minor problem that affects just the wealthy countries. Earlier researchers had warned of a "ticking time bomb" of TB cases in the US and other wealthy countries that should be a focus of attention. The work of Ramakrishnan and her coauthors cast doubt on this warning. Writing in The Atlantic, science journalist Katherine J. Wu commented that "even the world's biggest authorities on TB are dispensing with what was once conventional wisdom."

=== Awards and honours ===
Ramakrishnan was elected a Member of the US National Academy of Sciences in 2015. She has received a number of other awards, including a National Institutes of Health (NIH) Director's Pioneer Award and a Burroughs Wellcome Fund Investigators in the Pathogenesis of Infectious Disease Award. She also served on the Life Sciences jury for the Infosys Prize in 2016. In 2018 she was elected a Fellow of the Royal Society (FRS) and Fellow of the Academy of Medical Sciences (FMedSci). She was made a member of the European Molecular Biology Organization (EMBO) in 2019.
