= Frederic Durán-Jordà =

Catalan hemotologist (1905–1957)

- Durán i Jordà in 1936
- Born: 25 April 1905; Barcelona, Spain
- Died: 30 March 1957 (aged 51); Manchester, United Kingdom
- Known for: Work in blood transfusions
- Scientific career
- Fields: Hematology

Frederic Duran i Jordà (25 April 1905 – 30 March 1957) was a Catalan medical doctor and a pioneer in hematology and hemotherapy. He created the first transfusion service in the world in Barcelona in 1936 at the beginning of the Spanish Civil War. Previously there were blood banks, where donated blood was stored waiting to be transfused. Dr. Duran i Jordà created a methodology that would serve to collect blood donations to be transfused elsewhere, in this case the front lines of the Spanish Civil War. This method was subsequently applied in World War II.

== Personal life ==
Duran was born in the Barcelona district of Barceloneta on 25 April 1905 to a middle-class family originally from Martorell. His father was a merchant concerned with culture and sport who worried that the youngest of his five children, Frederic, had an education. He had originally planned for an elementary education, but the child's ability impressed his teachers who persuaded his father to allow him to continue onto higher education and attend college. There were discrepancies between father and son regarding his studies; Frederic was attracted to Chemistry but eventually paternal pragmatism prevailed and he enrolled in Medicine in 1922. He received his degree at age 23 in June 1928.

During college, his interest in Chemistry led him to laboratory testings and, while he was an intern under Antoni Trias Pujol at the Department of Surgical Pathology in the Hospital Clínic de Barcelona he began working in that area, first in the Clinical Analysis of Gastroenterology Section and later becoming an Analyst of the City of Barcelona and directing the laboratory at the Les Corts Psychiatric Institute, a position he held until the end of the Civil War.

In February 1939, at the end of the Spanish Civil War, Duran i Jordà had to leave in exile. He was able to migrate to London, UK through an exclusive invitation extended by the British Red Cross; there, along others like Josep Trueta, he became part of a numerically small but qualitatively enormous 'Catalan diaspora' in Great Britain. The British Red Cross, being aware of Duran's work through Janet Vaughan and in preparation for war, had wanted to recreate the Blood Service he had developed in Barcelona. Durán then moved to Manchester where he worked as a laboratory technician at Ancoats Hospital while sorting out the necessary paperwork to enter the Medical Register. Once achieved, he devoted himself to Pathology and became the director of said department at Booths Hall Children's Hospital, Manchester and the Monsall Hospital.

He died of leukaemia on 30 March 1957 at the Manchester Royal Infirmary, at 51 years of age.

== Career ==
=== Precedents ===
To understand the magnitude of Duran i Jordà's work one must examine it in its historical context. The discovery of ABO blood groups by Karl Landsteiner (not yet the Rhesus factor) in the early twentieth century gave way to the scientific development of transfusion therapy, hitherto surrounded by a halo of superstition and fraud. The obvious need for transfused blood to have a human origin lead to transfusions being initially performed by arm-to-arm approximation.

In the early 1920s what would later be called the British Red Cross Transfusion Service was established in Greater London, which consisted of an indexed registry of volunteer blood donors who had previously undergone a series of tests, including a physical examination, blood group typing and syphilis screening, who would be called whenever a hospital transfusion was needed. During its first year, only 13 petitions were received; however, in the 1930s, over 30,000 calls were processed per year.

During this same time, methods to anticoagulate blood in order to facilitate its transfusion were being carried out. A Belgian researcher Albert Hustin published in April 1914 a method which used sodium citrate, and on November 15 Dr. Luis Agote performed in Buenos Aires the first transfusion with blood which had been anticoagulated with citrate. Later, in 1915, Richard Lewisohn of Mount Sinai Hospital in New York studied receptor tolerability and established the citrate proportion per blood bag in 0.2%. Despite these findings, the anticoagulant characteristics of citrate which allowed it to be stored were still not common knowledge and so during World War II most blood transfusions were still performed through almost direct contact between donor and recipient: blood was extracted from the first, kept in citrate, but immediately transfused.

Earlier attempts to preserve blood for transfusion were made in Russia. In 1930, Dr Sergei Yudin first used in Moscow Sklifosovsky Institute, a specialised emergency hospital, blood extracted from corpses for transfusion, keeping it stored in citrate at a temperature of 4 °C. By 1938, he had transfused corpse blood to 2,500 individuals, of whom 7 died and 125 experienced mild reactions consisting of fever and chills.

In 1937, Dr. Bernard Fantus, a doctor at Cook County Hospital in Chicago, developed a Service which collected blood donations in glass jars and stored them in cold citrate after analysis. He called it the Blood Conservation Laboratory, but it soon received an alternative name on the basis of it being a deposit and/or retrieve service, which then quickly became popular: Blood Bank. However, five months earlier one such Service had already been established in Barcelona: the first Transfusion Service designed to collect, store and carry blood to be transfused at a distance was the work of Frederic Duran i Jordà.

=== Barcelona Transfusion Service ===
At that time, transfusions in Barcelona were done with a Jubé syringe, extracting and injecting it in one same procedure without delay. In 1935 Dr. Ricardo Moragas reported a total of 128 transfusions by the Blood Transfusion Service of the Hospital de Sant Pau i la Santa Creu, all through this direct method, from 83 family donors, 29 hospital donors and 16 so-called "professional donors". It was noted that direct transfusions sometimes required the surgical exposure of the arm vein which hindered further donations / transfusions.

At that time only Dr. José Antonio Grífols Roig performed indirect citrated blood transfusions, with the aid of a transfusion flebula he designed. The device consisted of a glass vessel where the donor's blood was collected in citrate to then be infused into the recipient by injecting air into the glass container. The technique was complicated and hindered by the high risk of bacterial contamination derived from the use of an external circuit, which did not allow for more than a few hours of storage.

When the Civil War broke Dr Durán joined Hospital 18, located on the mountain of Montjuïc. There, he realised most times the amount of blood a patient needed was greater than what could be provided from a unique donor's direct transfusion. He then received letters from colleagues Wenceslao Dutrem and Serafina Palma, on the Aragón front, who complained about the lack of blood for the wounded. This all made him decide to leave the hospital and, with the support of the Medical Service Republican Army, strive to create a programme which would be able to provide the necessary blood for transfusion to both military and civilian victims.

This Transfusion Service was initially located in the premises of the Hospital 18 de Montjuïc. A group of collaborators was incorporated, including Alfred Benlloch Llorach and Enric Margarit Aleu, who were essential in developing specialised technology for the programme. Intense work throughout August allowed for a first batch of seven litres of blood to be sent to hospitals on the Aragón front in mid-September. Subsequently, in order to meet the growing blood demand on the front and improve donor accessibility to the premises, the Transfusion Service was moved to the city centre, to Calle Mallorca 216 (between Balmes and Enrique Granados) on 5 February 1938.

The Service was visited by numerous foreign medical specialists, like Dr Norman Bethune who arrived in Spain in November 1936. Dr Bethune then developed a similar service in Madrid.

Dr. Durán also presented his programme in many foreign countries, including Czechoslovakia and Britain, using a film in English created for that purpose.

=== Durán method ===
On a potential donor's first visit, name, address and medical history were recorded. If there were no grounds for exclusion, an initial blood extraction was used for blood group testing as well as for syphilis screening through a Wasserman-Bordet test. Eligible donors were then called the following week for extraction. At first, only O group donor blood would be sent to the front, and A group blood was stored for transfusion in the city hospitals, prior patient's blood group determination.

Donors were required not to have had any meals before the extraction, and could donate every three to four weeks. The amount of blood collected was 300-400ml, adding 10% of a 4% citrate solution. The donor would lie on a stretcher and the chosen venipuncture area would be cleaned with iodine and alcohol and then marked with sterile drapes. A needle modified by Durán was used for the extraction of blood into 500mL flasks which were in continuous movement to favour the mixing of blood with the anticoagulant, using a vacuum system.

The blood contained in the flasks was later tested to ensure there had been no contamination, by withdrawing a sample which was added to agar tubes. The supernatant was used to recheck blood group. Despite this testing, blood group typing often had errors because of poor quality of the reagents used, which were prepared in the Blood Service itself. This led to compatibility testing before transfusions, which was performed through Ochlecker's biological test: 5mL of blood would be injected and the patient evaluated during the next 10–15 minutes for signs of reaction.

The blood of six donors with the same blood group would be mixed in a 2L Erlenmeyer flask, which contained a filtre made of silk fabric with small pores of approximately 250microns which helped removing clots and aggregates formed during the extraction.

Initially, the blood, once mixed, was placed in 300mL ball-shaped glass jars with a rubber stopper crossed by small glass tubes. For transfusion, air would be injected into the jars through the rubber stopper so that blood would flow through the available tubes and out of the jars. Thanks to the collaboration of Dr. Cullell of Pujol-Cullell Laboratorios this method was later replaced by a sterile glass vessel which was closed at maximum pressure with a voltaic arc. These were called Rapide tubes, a patent Dr. Cullell had bought from a Madrid engineer. The Rapide system used the needle and filter already contained in the jars, which allowed for transfusions to be carried out without external apparatus in the war frontline.

Blood bottles were stored at 2 °C for up to 15 days. Before use, they were checked for integrity of the interface separating the red cell and plasma packages, which had to be yellow; bottles with a haemolytic supernatant were discarded. If the appearance of the bottle was right, it would be heated in a water bath prior to administration.

After over 130 transfusions following Durán's method, Dr. José Vives Mañé stated, "The Durán method has the advantage of being quick and easy. Our results make us his strongest supporters, for we are convinced that in the front it is irreplaceable".

A four-ton Diamon truck with two generators owned by Mr. Vidal, which was previously engaged in transporting fish from the north and thus suitably conditioned for blood transportation, allowed for the first time in history in late August 1936 the transport of blood for transfusion to a distance of about 300 km. This way, weekly shipments were made to the front and to hospitals, which tried to keep a blood stock of 35 litres per hospital.

During the 30 months it was active, the Barcelona Transfusion Service registered around 28,900 donors, received more than 20,000 donations, and processed and prepared for transfusion 9,000 litres of blood.

When Frederic Durán i Jordà fled to Britain in 1938, he worked with Dr Janet Vaughan at the Royal Postgraduate Medical School at Hammersmith Hospital to create a system of national blood banks in London. With the imminent outbreak of war in 1938, the War Office created the Army Blood Supply Depot (ABSD) in Bristol, headed by Lionel Whitby supervising four large blood depots around the country. British policy through the war was to supply military personnel with blood from centralised storage banks, whereas donations for American and German soldiers were extracted from troops at the front, who were bled to provide required blood. The British method proved to be more successful at adequately meeting all requirements and over 700,000 donors were bled over the course of the war. This system evolved into the National Blood Transfusion Service established in 1946, the first blood transfusion national service to be implemented.

=== Contributions ===
Durán i Jordà developed several innovations in blood transfusion service practice:

- He realised the best way to leverage blood was not to take it from hospital to hospital, but to create a large and stable organization to provide such service. Nowadays centralisation of all donations is still a key point in blood transfusion.
- He quickly saw that investigations using blood drawn from corpses were misguided. It was essential to use living donors. Today, these donors are volunteers.
- He pioneered in promotion of blood donation, aware that appeals should be made through radio, concerts, etc.
- Durán preferred donors to be fasting prior to blood collection; however today this is not the case.
- He recommended a minimum period of three weeks between donations, yet currently donors must wait at least 60 days; women can donate 3 times per year and men 4.
- He advised blood filtration should always happen in closed systems under vacuum to avoid contamination. This still applies.
- To minimise risks, he decided to mix blood from different donors with the same blood group. At present, each patient receives their same blood type.
- He kept blood refrigerated, at a temperature of between 2 and 4 °C, which still remains so.
- Durán-Jordà ended arm-to-arm transfusions and gave way to current autoinjectable donations.
- He perfected a glass container to store the blood with transparent and neutral glass which had two compartments, one at the bottom with a capacity of 400 cm^{2} containing blood, and another at the top with ultra filtered air with 2atm pressure. Nowadays totally sterilised plastic bags are used.
- He hinted blood fractions could be transfused individually (plasma, platelets ...)
- He favoured the creation of the first mobile unit to transport blood, a refrigerated truck. Now, mobile units are equipped with trays of butanediol to control the temperature of blood donations.

Durán i Jordà's transfusion service established organizational principles and contamination prevention protocols that influenced subsequent blood banking. Though the technologies he and his team created have since become obsolete, the principles and theoretical foundations on which it was based continue to this day to be critical in blood preservation.

== Bibliography ==
- Red Gold Epic History of Blood. Duran-Jorda and Barcelona Blood Transfusion Service. Consultable in https://www.pbs.org/wnet/redgold/history/timeline4.html and https://www.pbs.org/wnet/redgold/basics/ukandspain2.html.
- Broggi Vallès About Frederic M. Duran Jorda. Gimbernat 1997; 27: 185–191
- Duran-Jorda, F (1939). "The Barcelona Blood-Transfusion Service". Lancet. 233 (6031): 773–776. doi:10.1016/s0140-6736(00)60392-6.
- Benlloch Llorach Alfredo Duran Jorda F, "Contribution to the study of the in vitro metabolism of citrated blood preserved. The destruction of complement." Health Magazine 1937 War 344–47
- Duran Jorda Frederic C. Tort the servei I sang transfusion. Gimbernat 1993; 20: 83–90.
- Grífols Espés Frederic J. Duran Jorda: "a method and a time". Editorial Medical Action. Barcelona. 2004.
- Lozano, M; Frederic, Cid J. (2007). "Duran Jordà: A pioneer Transfusion Medicine". Transfer Med Rev. 21 (1): 75–81. doi:10.1016/j.tmrv.2006.08.004. PMID 17256247.
- Schneider, WH (2003). "Blood transfusion Between the wars". J Hist Med Allied Sci. 58 (2): 187–224. doi:10.1093/jhmas/58.2.187. PMID 12776438. S2CID 22066766.
- Starr D. Blood: An Epic History of Medicine and Commerce. Alfred A. Knopf. New York. 1998.
- Mañé J. Vives "130 Results obtained in citrated blood transfusions, Duran method". Health Magazine War 1938: 2; 101–5
- Grífols, Joan R. (2007). "The contribution of Dr. Duran-Jorda to the advancement and development of European blood transfusion". ISBT Science Series. 2: 134–138. doi:10.1111/j.1751-2824.2007.00078.x. S2CID 71850079.
- Lozano, M; Cid, J (January 2007). "DEFINE_ME_WA". Transfusion Medicine Reviews. 21 (1). tmreviews.com: 75–81. doi:10.1016/j.tmrv.2006.08.004. PMID 17256247.
- Odyssey Albion
- "Publicaciones Defensa". portalcultura.mde.es. Archived from the original on 1 October 2010.
- "Reivindicación de Duran Jordà - Edición impresa - EL PAÍS". El País. elpais.com. 11 February 2006.
