= Venki Ramakrishnan =

British-American structural biologist (born 1952)

Venki Ramakrishnan OM
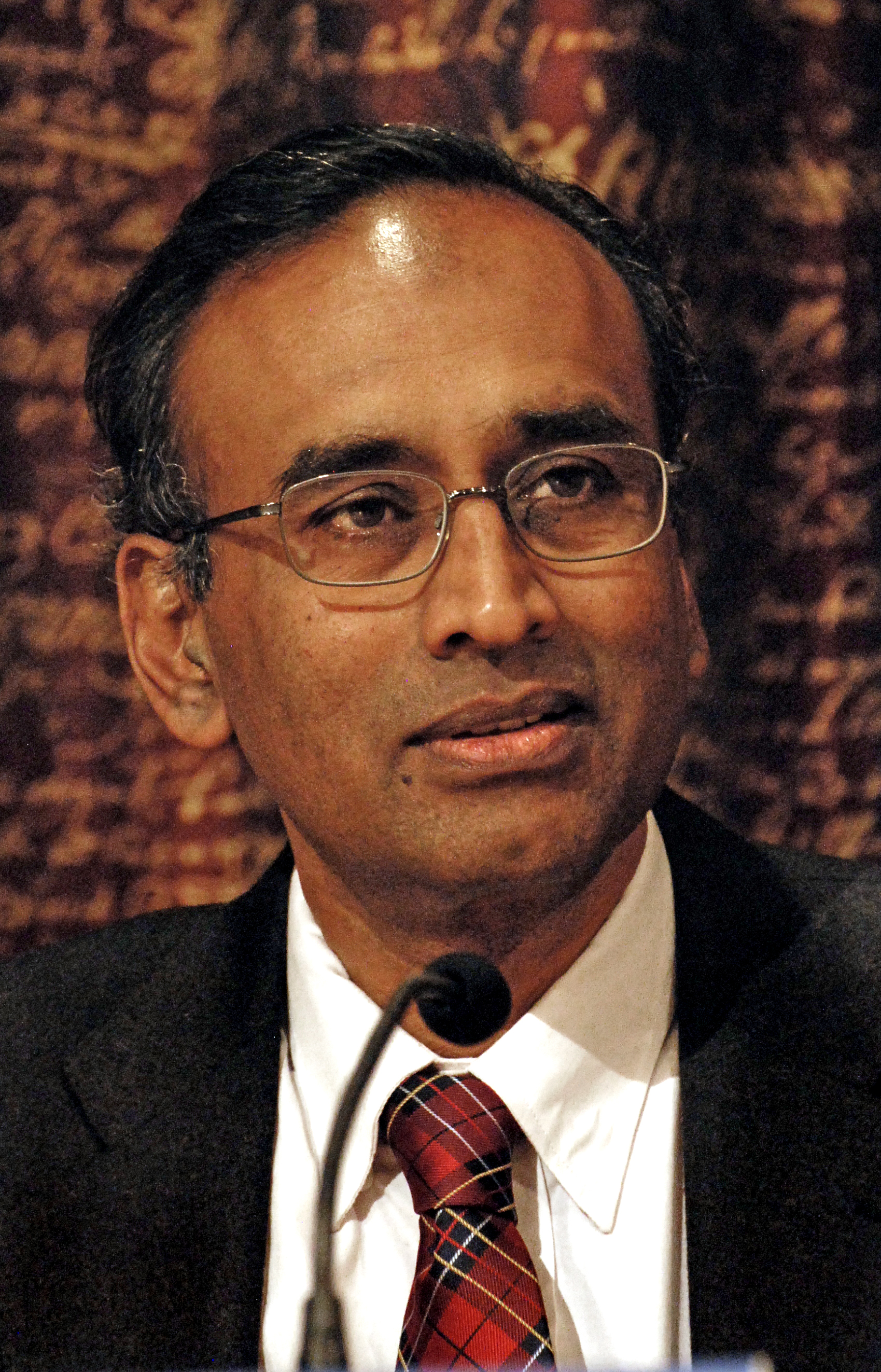
- Ramakrishnan at the Nobel Prize Press conference in 2009

62nd President of the Royal Society
- In office 1 December 2015 – 30 November 2020
- Preceded by: Paul Nurse
- Succeeded by: Adrian Smith

Personal details
- Born: Venkatraman Ramakrishnan; 1952 (age 73–74) Chidambaram, Madras State (now Tamil Nadu), India
- Citizenship: United Kingdom; United States
- Spouse: Vera Rosenberry (m. 1975)
- Children: 1
- Parents: Prof. C. V. Ramakrishnan (father); Rajalakshmi Ramakrishnan (mother)
- Relatives: Lalita Ramakrishnan (sister)
- Website: www2.mrc-lmb.cam.ac.uk/group-leaders/n-to-s/venki-ramakrishnan
- Known for: Structure and function of the ribosome; macromolecular crystallography
- Awards: Knight Bachelor (2012); Padma Vibhushan (2010); Nobel Prize in Chemistry (2009); Louis-Jeantet Prize for Medicine (2007); Order of Merit (2022)

Academic background
- Education: Maharaja Sayajirao University of Baroda (BSc); University of California, San Diego; Ohio University (PhD)
- Thesis: The Green Function Theory of the Ferroelectric Phase Transition in Potassium Dihydrogen-Phosphate (1976)
- Doctoral advisor: Tomoyasu Tanaka

Academic work
- School or tradition: Biochemistry; Biophysics
- Institutions: Laboratory of Molecular Biology; University of Cambridge; Oak Ridge National Laboratory; Yale University; University of Utah; Brookhaven National Laboratory

Venkatraman Ramakrishnan (born 1952) is an Indian origin British-American structural biologist. He shared the 2009 Nobel Prize in Chemistry with Thomas A. Steitz and Ada Yonath for research on the structure and function of ribosomes.

Since 1999, he has worked as a group leader at the Medical Research Council (MRC) Laboratory of Molecular Biology (LMB) on the Cambridge Biomedical Campus, UK and is a Fellow of Trinity College, Cambridge. He served as President of the Royal Society from 2015 to 2020.

== Education and early life ==
Ramakrishnan was born in 1952 in Chidambaram in Cuddalore district of Tamil Nadu, India.

His parents, Prof. C. V. Ramakrishnan and Prof. Rajalakshmi Ramakrishnan were both scientists, and his father was head of the department of biochemistry at the Maharaja Sayajirao University of Baroda. At the time of his birth, Ramakrishnan's father was away from India doing postdoctoral research with David E. Green at the University of Wisconsin–Madison in the US. Ramakrishnan's mother obtained a PhD in psychology from McGill University in 1959, completing it in only 18 months, and was mentored, among others, by Donald O. Hebb.

Ramakrishnan has one sibling, his younger sister Lalita Ramakrishnan, who is professor of immunology and infectious diseases at the department of medicine, University of Cambridge, and a member of the National Academy of Sciences.

Ramakrishnan moved to Vadodara (previously also known as Baroda) in Gujarat at the age of three, where he had his entire schooling at the Convent of Jesus and Mary, except for a year and a half (1960–61) which he and his family spent in Adelaide, Australia. Following his pre-science at the Maharaja Sayajirao University of Baroda, he did his undergraduate studies in the same university on a National Science Talent Scholarship, graduating with a Bachelor of Science degree in physics in 1971. At the time, the physics course at Baroda was new, and based in part on the Berkeley Physics Course and The Feynman Lectures on Physics.

Immediately after graduation, he moved to the US, where he obtained his Doctor of Philosophy degree in physics from Ohio University in 1976 for research into the ferroelectric phase transition of potassium dihydrogen phosphate (KDP) supervised by Tomoyasu Tanaka. Then he spent two years studying biology as a graduate student at the University of California, San Diego while making a transition from theoretical physics to biology.

== Career and research ==
Ramakrishnan began work on ribosomes as a postdoctoral fellow with Peter Moore at Yale University. After his postdoctoral fellowship, he initially could not find a faculty position even though he had applied to about 50 universities in the United States.

He continued to work on ribosomes from 1983 to 1995 as a staff scientist at Brookhaven National Laboratory.

In 1995, he moved to the University of Utah as a professor of biochemistry, and in 1999, he moved to the Medical Research Council Laboratory of Molecular Biology in Cambridge, England, where he had been a sabbatical visitor during 1991–92 on a Guggenheim Fellowship.

In 1999, Ramakrishnan's laboratory published a 5.5 angstrom resolution structure of the 30S subunit. The following year, his laboratory determined the complete molecular structure of the 30S subunit of the ribosome and its complexes with several antibiotics. This was followed by studies that provided structural insights into the mechanism that ensures the fidelity of protein biosynthesis. In 2007, his laboratory determined the atomic structure of the whole ribosome in complex with its tRNA and mRNA ligands. Since 2013, he has used Cryogenic electron microscopy to work primarily on eukaryotic and mitochondrial translation. Ramakrishnan is also known for his work on histone and chromatin structure.

As of 2019 his most cited papers according to Google Scholar have been published in Nature, Science, and Cell.

=== Presidency of the Royal Society ===
Ramakrishnan's term as president of the Royal Society from 2015–2020 was dominated by Brexit and, in his final year, the COVID-19 pandemic and its response. In an interview in July 2018, he said that Britain's decision to leave the European Union was hurting Britain's reputation as a good place to work in science, commenting "It's very hard for the science community to see any advantages in Brexit. They are pretty blunt about that." He saw advantages to both the UK and the EU for Britain to continue to be engaged in Galileo and Euratom, which, unlike the European Medicines Agency, are not EU agencies.

Ramakrishnan argued that a no-deal Brexit would harm science. Ramakrishnan wrote, "A deal on science is in the best interests of Europe as a whole and should not be sacrificed as collateral damage over disagreements on other issues. If we are going to successfully tackle global problems like climate change, human disease and food security, we can't do so in isolation. There is no scenario where trashing our relationships with our closest scientific collaborators in the EU gets us closer to these goals."

=== Awards and honours ===
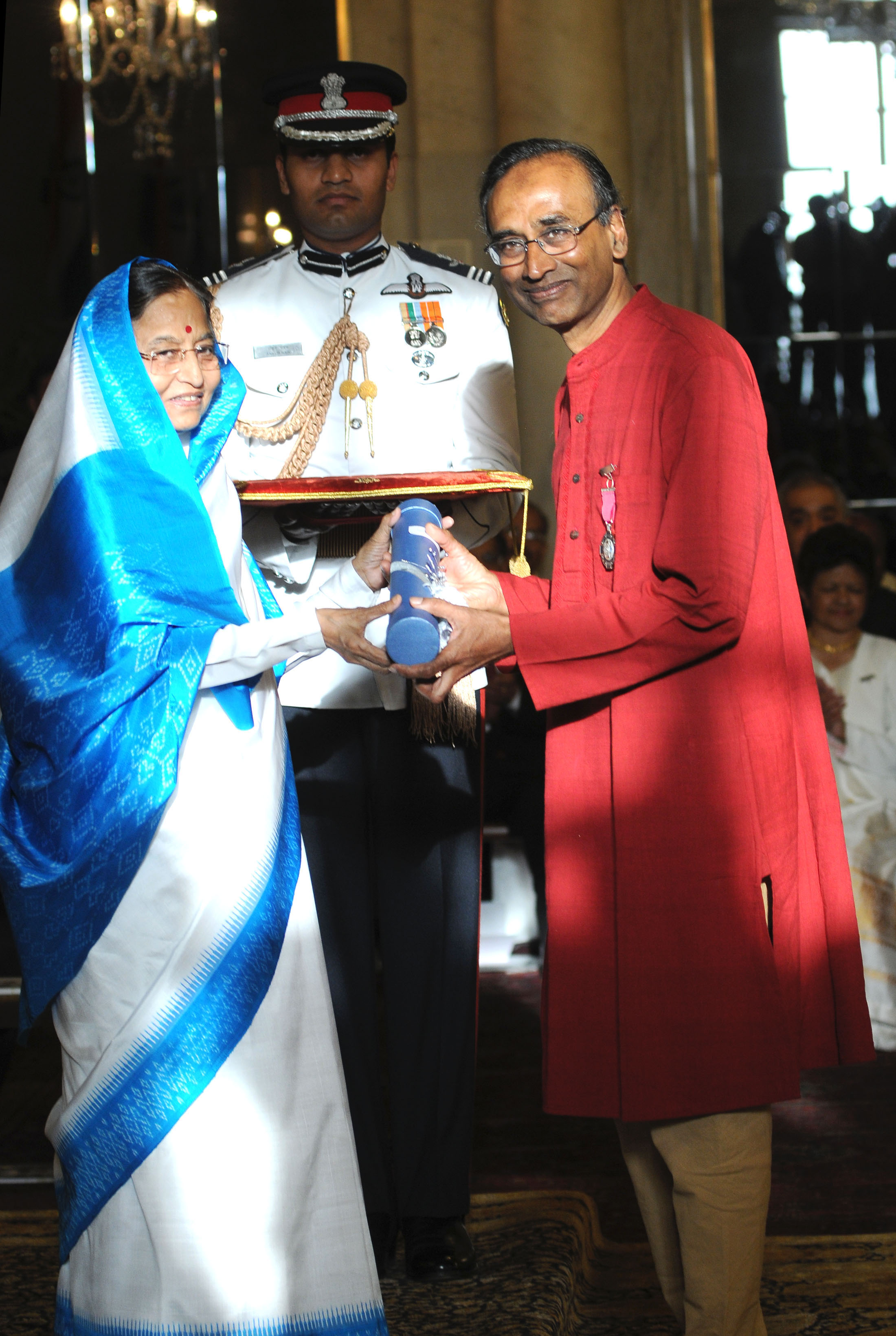
The President, Smt. Pratibha Devisingh Patil presenting Padma Vibhushan Award to Dr. Venkatraman Ramakrishnan, at the Civil Investiture Ceremony-I, at Rashtrapati Bhavan, in New Delhi on March 31, 2010

Ramakrishnan was elected a Member of the European Molecular Biology Organization in 2002, a Fellow of the Royal Society (FRS) in 2003, and a Member of the U.S. National Academy of Sciences in 2004.

In 2007, Ramakrishnan was awarded the Louis-Jeantet Prize for Medicine and the Datta Lectureship and Medal of the Federation of European Biochemical Societies (FEBS).

Ramakrishnan was awarded the Nobel Prize in Chemistry in 2009, along with Thomas A. Steitz and Ada Yonath. He received India's second highest civilian honor, the Padma Vibhushan, in 2010.

In 2008, Ramakrishnan won the Heatley Medal of the British Biochemical Society, and became a Fellow of Trinity College, Cambridge and a foreign Fellow of the Indian National Science Academy. He has been a member of the German Academy of Sciences Leopoldina and an Honorary Fellow of the Academy of Medical Sciences (Hon FMedSci) since 2010.

He has received honorary degrees from the Maharaja Sayajirao University of Baroda, University of Utah, Ohio University and University of Cambridge. He is also an Honorary Fellow of Trinity College, Cambridge, Somerville College, Oxford, and The Queen's College, Oxford.

Ramakrishnan was made a Knight Bachelor in the 2012 New Year Honours for services to molecular biology, but does not generally use the associated title "Sir". That same year, he was awarded the Sir Hans Krebs Medal by the FEBS. In 2014, he was awarded the XLVI Jiménez-Díaz Prize by the Fundación Conchita Rábago (Spain).

In 2017, Ramakrishnan received the Golden Plate Award of the American Academy of Achievement.

Ramakrishnan was included as one of 25 Greatest Global Living Indians by NDTV Channel, India on 14 December 2013.

His certificate of election to the Royal Society reads:

Ramakrishnan is internationally recognised for determination of the atomic structure of the 30S ribosomal subunit. Earlier he mapped the arrangement of proteins in the 30S subunit by neutron diffraction and solved X-ray structures of individual components and their RNA complexes. Fundamental insights came from his crystallographic studies of the complete 30S subunit. The atomic model included over 1500 bases of RNA and 20 associated proteins. The RNA interactions representing the P-site tRNA and the mRNA binding site were identified and the likely modes of action of many clinically important antibiotics determined. His most recent work goes to the heart of the decoding mechanism showing the 30S subunit complexed with poly-U mRNA and the stem-loop of the cognate phenylalanine tRNA. Anti-codon recognition leaves the "wobble" base free to accommodate certain non-Watson/Crick basepairs, thus providing an atomic description of both codon:anti-codon recognition and "wobble". He has also made substantial contributions to understanding how chromatin is organised, particularly the structure of linker histones and their role in higher order folding.

In 2020, he was elected to the American Philosophical Society and became a board member of the British Library.

Ramakrishnan was made a Member of the Order of Merit (OM) in 2022.

== Personal life ==
In 1975, Ramakrishnan married Vera Rosenberry, an author and illustrator of children's books. He has a step-daughter, Tanya Kapka, a physician, specializing in public health and health-care delivery to under-served communities; and a son, Raman Ramakrishnan, a cellist specializing in chamber music and professor at Bard College in New York State.

== Books ==
- Why We Die: The New Science of Aging and The Quest for Immortality (2024)
- Gene Machine: The Race to Decipher the Secrets of the Ribosome (2018)

Professional and academic associations
Preceded by Paul Nurse	62nd President of the Royal Society; 2015–2020	Succeeded by Adrian Smith
