= Blood bank =

Place where blood donations are collected

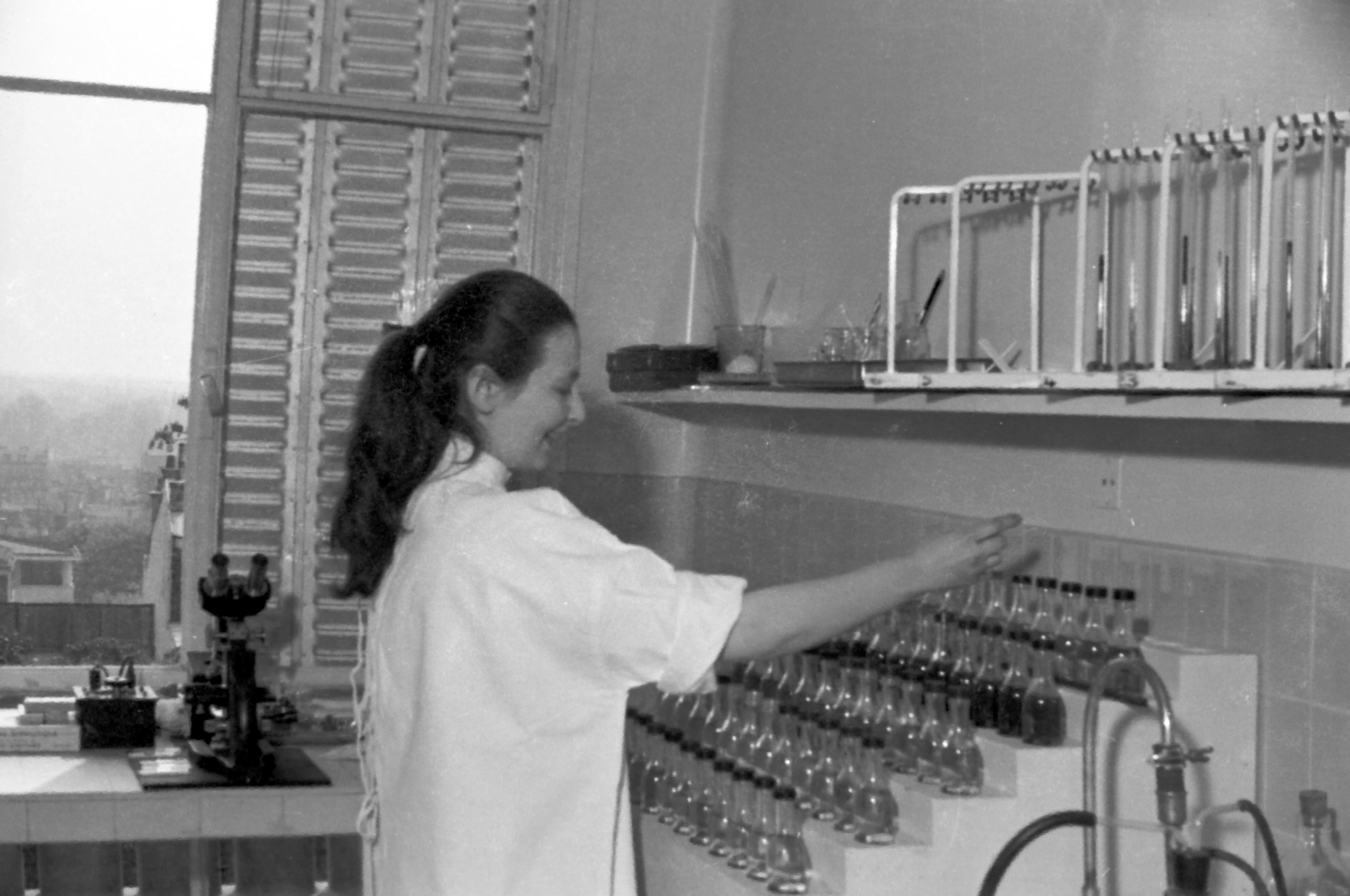
Blood bank in France

A blood bank is a center where blood gathered as a result of blood donation is stored and preserved for later use in blood transfusion. The term "blood bank" typically refers to a department of a hospital usually within a clinical pathology laboratory where the storage of blood product occurs and where pre-transfusion and blood compatibility testing is performed. However, it sometimes refers to a collection center, and some hospitals also perform collection. Blood banking includes tasks related to blood collection, processing, testing, separation, and storage.

For blood donation agencies in various countries, see list of blood donation agencies and list of blood donation agencies in the United States.

== Types of blood transfused ==
Several types of blood transfusion exist:

- Whole blood, which is blood transfused without separation.
- Red blood cells or packed cells is transfused to patients with anemia/iron deficiency. It also helps to improve the oxygen saturation in blood. It can be stored at 2.0 °C-6.0 °C for 35–45 days.
- Platelet transfusion is transfused to those with low platelet count. Platelets can be stored at room temperature for up to 5–7 days. Single donor platelets, which have a more platelet count but it is bit expensive than regular.
- Plasma transfusion is indicated to patients with liver failure, severe infections or serious burns. Fresh frozen plasma can be stored at a very low temperature of −30 °C for up to 12 months. The separation of plasma from a donor's blood is called plasmapheresis.

== History ==
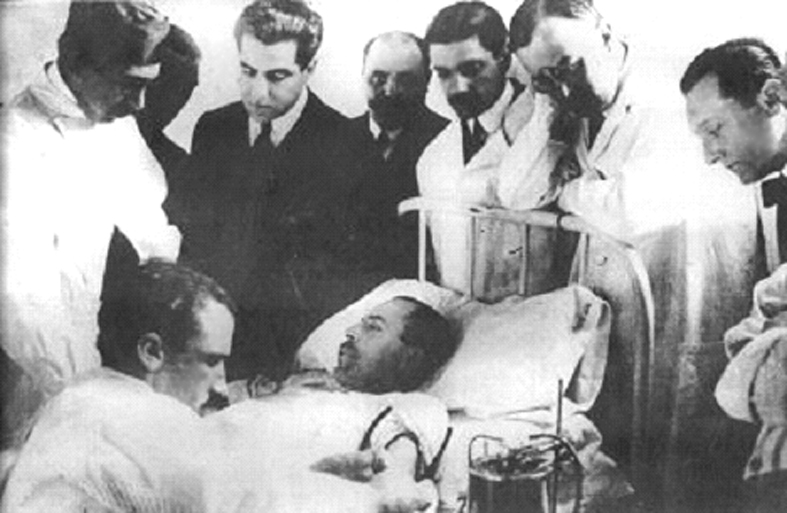
Luis Agote (second from right) overseeing one of the first safe and effective blood transfusions in 1914

While the first blood transfusions were made directly from donor to receiver before coagulation, it was discovered that by adding anticoagulant and refrigerating the blood it was possible to store it for some days, thus opening the way for the development of blood banks. John Braxton Hicks was the first to experiment with chemical methods to prevent the coagulation of blood at St Mary's Hospital, London, in the late 19th century. His attempts, using phosphate of soda, however, were unsuccessful.

The first non-direct transfusion was performed on March 27, 1914, by the Belgian doctor Albert Hustin, though this was a diluted solution of blood. The Argentine doctor Luis Agote used a much less diluted solution in November of the same year. Both used sodium citrate as an anticoagulant.

=== First World War ===
The First World War acted as a catalyst for the rapid development of blood banks and transfusion techniques. Inspired by the need to give blood to wounded soldiers in the absence of a donor, Francis Peyton Rous at the Rockefeller University (then The Rockefeller Institute for Medical Research) wanted to solve the problems of blood transfusion. With a colleague, Joseph R. Turner, he made two critical discoveries: blood typing was necessary to avoid blood clumping (coagulation) and blood samples could be preserved using chemical treatment. Their report in March 1915 to identify possible blood preservative was of a failure. The experiments with gelatine, agar, blood serum extracts, starch and beef albumin proved useless.

In June 1915, they made the first important report in the Journal of the American Medical Association that agglutination could be avoided if the blood samples of the donor and recipient were tested before. They developed a rapid and simple method for testing blood compatibility in which coagulation and the suitability of the blood for transfusion could be easily determined. They used sodium citrate to dilute the blood samples, and after mixing the recipient's and donor's blood in 9:1 and 1:1 parts, blood would either clump or remain watery after 15 minutes. Their result with a medical advice was clear:

[If] clumping is present in the 9:1 mixture and to a less degree or not at all in the 1:1 mixture, it is certain that the blood of the patient agglutinates that of the donor and may perhaps hemolyze it. Transfusion in such cases is dangerous. Clumping in the 1:1 mixture with little or none in the 9:1 indicates that the plasma of the prospective donor agglutinates the cells of the prospective recipient. The risk from transfusing is much less under such circumstances, but it may be doubted whether the blood is as useful as one which does not and is not agglutinated. A blood of the latter kind should always be chosen if possible.

Rous was well aware that Austrian physician Karl Landsteiner had discovered blood types a decade earlier, but the practical usage was not yet developed, as he described: "The fate of Landsteiner's effort to call attention to the practical bearing of the group differences in human bloods provides an exquisite instance of knowledge marking time on technique. Transfusion was still not done because (until at least 1915), the risk of clotting was too great." In February 1916, they reported in the Journal of Experimental Medicine the key method for blood preservation. They replaced the additive, gelatine, with a mixture sodium citrate and glucose (dextrose) solution and found: "in a mixture of 3 parts of human blood, 2 parts of isotonic citrate solution (3.8 per cent sodium citrate in water), and 5 parts of isotonic dextrose solution (5.4 per cent dextrose in water), the cells remain intact for about 4 weeks." A separate report indicates the use of citrate-saccharose (sucrose) could maintain blood cells for two weeks. They noticed that the preserved bloods were just like fresh bloods and that they "function excellently when reintroduced into the body." The use of sodium citrate with sugar, sometimes known as Rous-Turner solution, was the main discovery that paved the way for the development of various blood preservation methods and blood bank.

Canadian Lieutenant Lawrence Bruce Robertson was instrumental in persuading the Royal Army Medical Corps (RAMC) to adopt the use of blood transfusion at the Casualty Clearing Stations for the wounded. In October 1915, Robertson performed his first wartime transfusion with a syringe to a patient who had multiple shrapnel wounds. He followed this up with four subsequent transfusions in the following months, and his success was reported to Sir Walter Morley Fletcher, director of the Medical Research Committee.

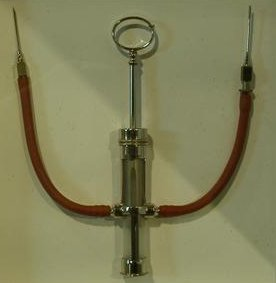
World War II Russian syringe for direct inter-human blood transfusion

Robertson published his findings in the British Medical Journal in 1916, and—with the help of a few like minded individuals (including the eminent physician Edward William Archibald)—was able to persuade the British authorities of the merits of blood transfusion. Robertson went on to establish the first blood transfusion apparatus at a Casualty Clearing Station on the Western Front in the spring of 1917.

Oswald Hope Robertson, a medical researcher and U.S. Army officer, worked with Rous at the Rockefeller between 1915 and 1917, and learned the blood matching and preservation methods. He was attached to the RAMC in 1917, where he was instrumental in establishing the first blood banks, with soldiers as donors, in preparation for the anticipated Third Battle of Ypres. He used sodium citrate as the anticoagulant, and the blood was extracted from punctures in the vein, and was stored in bottles at British and American Casualty Clearing Stations along the Front. He also experimented with preserving separated red blood cells in iced bottles. Geoffrey Keynes, a British surgeon, developed a portable machine that could store blood to enable transfusions to be carried out more easily.

=== Expansion ===
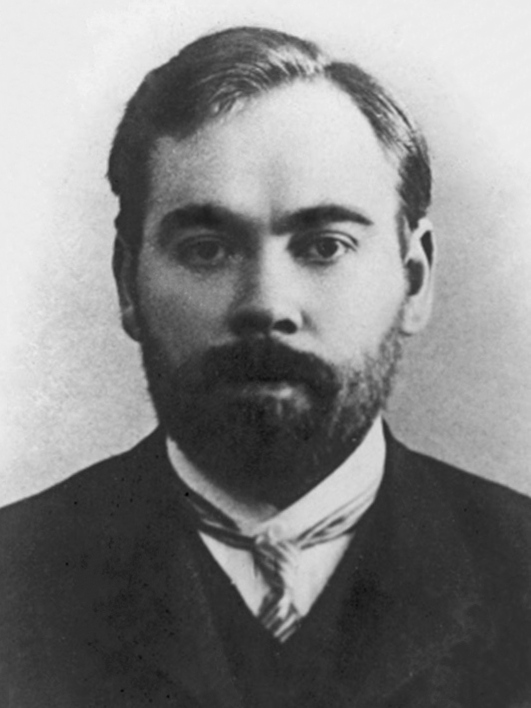
Alexander Bogdanov established a scientific institute to research the effects of blood transfusion in Moscow, 1925.

The world's first blood donor service was established in 1921 by the secretary of the British Red Cross, Percy Lane Oliver. Volunteers were subjected to a series of physical tests to establish their blood group. The London Blood Transfusion Service was free of charge and expanded rapidly. By 1925, it was providing services for almost 500 patients and it was incorporated into the structure of the British Red Cross in 1926. Similar systems were established in other cities including Sheffield, Manchester and Norwich, and the service's work began to attract international attention. Similar services were established in France, Germany, Austria, Belgium, Australia and Japan.

Vladimir Shamov and Sergei Yudin in the Soviet Union pioneered the transfusion of cadaveric blood from recently deceased donors. Yudin performed such a transfusion successfully for the first time on March 23, 1930, and reported his first seven clinical transfusions with cadaveric blood at the Fourth Congress of Ukrainian Surgeons at Kharkiv in September. Also in 1930, Yudin organized the world's first blood bank at the Nikolay Sklifosovsky Institute, which set an example for the establishment of further blood banks in different regions of the Soviet Union and in other countries. By the mid-1930s the Soviet Union had set up a system of at least 65 large blood centers and more than 500 subsidiary ones, all storing "canned" blood and shipping it to all corners of the country.

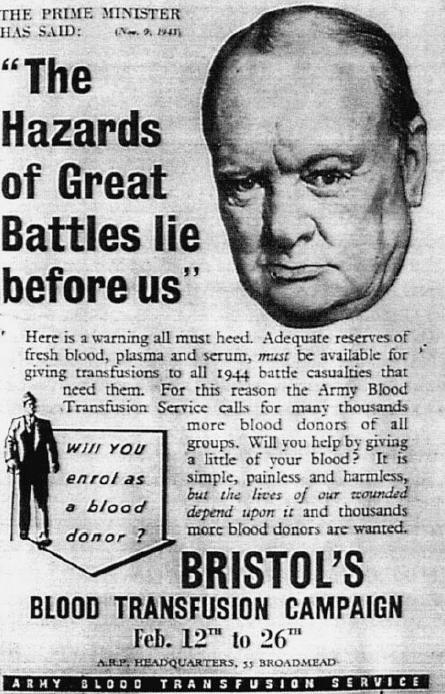
British poster encouraging people to donate blood for the war effort

One of the earliest blood banks was established by Frederic Durán-Jordà during the Spanish Civil War in 1936. Duran joined the Transfusion Service at the Barcelona Hospital at the start of the conflict, but the hospital was soon overwhelmed by the demand for blood and the paucity of available donors. With support from the Department of Health of the Spanish Republican Army, Duran established a blood bank for the use of wounded soldiers and civilians. The 300–400 ml of extracted blood was mixed with 10% citrate solution in a modified Duran Erlenmeyer flask. The blood was stored in a sterile glass enclosed under pressure at 2 °C. During 30 months of work, the Transfusion Service of Barcelona registered almost 30,000 donors, and processed 9,000 liters of blood.

In 1937 Bernard Fantus, director of therapeutics at the Cook County Hospital in Chicago, established one of the first hospital blood banks in the United States. In creating a hospital laboratory that preserved, refrigerated and stored donor blood, Fantus originated the term "blood bank". Within a few years, hospital and community blood banks were established across the United States.

Frederic Durán-Jordà fled to Britain in 1938, and worked with Janet Vaughan at the Royal Postgraduate Medical School at Hammersmith Hospital to create a system of national blood banks in London. With the outbreak of war looking imminent in 1938, the War Office created the Army Blood Supply Depot (ABSD) in Bristol headed by Lionel Whitby and in control of four large blood depots around the country. British policy through the war was to supply military personnel with blood from centralized depots, in contrast to the approach taken by the Americans and Germans where troops at the front were bled to provide required blood. The British method proved to be more successful at adequately meeting all requirements and over 700,000 donors were bled over the course of the war. This system evolved into the National Blood Transfusion Service established in 1946, the first national service to be implemented.

=== Medical advances ===
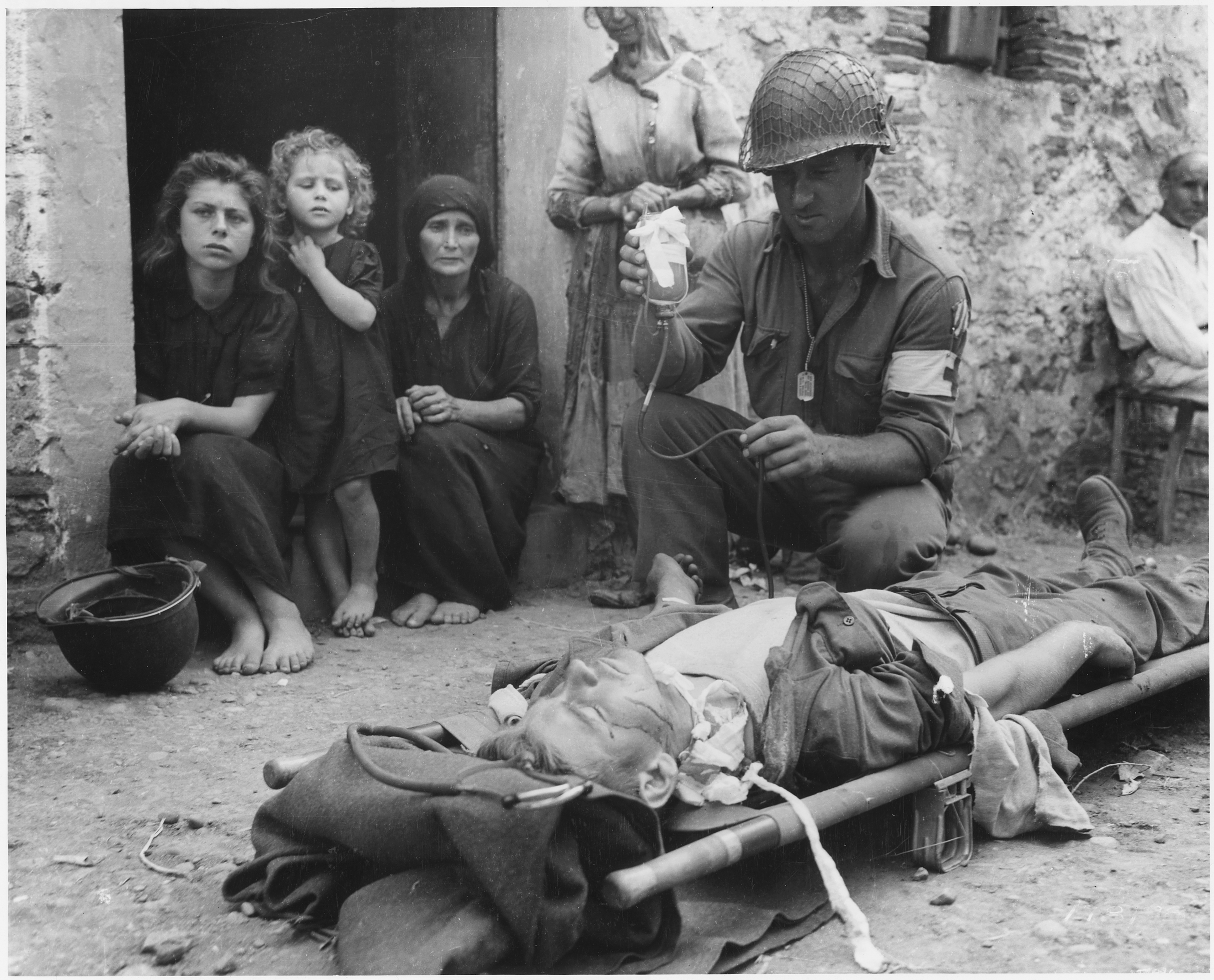
Wounded soldier is given blood plasma in Sicily, 1943.

A blood collection program was initiated in the US in 1940 and Edwin Cohn pioneered the process of blood fractionation. He worked out the techniques for isolating the serum albumin fraction of blood plasma, which is essential for maintaining the osmotic pressure in the blood vessels, preventing their collapse.

The use of blood plasma as a substitute for whole blood and for transfusion purposes was proposed as early as 1918, in the correspondence columns of the British Medical Journal, by Gordon R. Ward. At the onset of World War II, liquid plasma was used in Britain. A large project, known as 'Blood for Britain' began in August 1940 to collect blood in New York City hospitals for the export of plasma to Britain. A dried plasma package was developed, which reduced breakage and made the transportation, packaging, and storage much simpler.

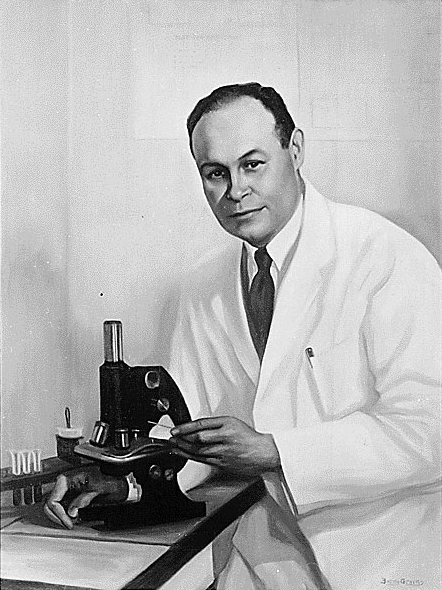
Charles R. Drew oversaw the production of blood plasma for shipping to Britain during WW2.

The resulting dried plasma package came in two tin cans containing 400 cc bottles. One bottle contained enough distilled water to reconstitute the dried plasma contained within the other bottle. In about three minutes, the plasma would be ready to use and could stay fresh for around four hours. Charles R. Drew was appointed medical supervisor, and he was able to transform the test tube methods into the first successful mass production technique.

Another important breakthrough came in 1939–40 when Karl Landsteiner, Alex Wiener, Philip Levine, and R.E. Stetson discovered the Rh blood group system, which was found to be the cause of the majority of transfusion reactions up to that time. Three years later, the introduction by J.F. Loutit and Patrick L. Mollison of acid-citrate-dextrose (ACD) solution, which reduced the volume of anticoagulant, permitted transfusions of greater volumes of blood and allowed longer-term storage.

Carl Walter and W.P. Murphy Jr. introduced the plastic bag for blood collection in 1950. Replacing breakable glass bottles with durable plastic bags allowed for the evolution of a collection system capable of safe and easy preparation of multiple blood components from a single unit of whole blood.

Further extending the shelf life of stored blood up to 42 days was an anticoagulant preservative, CPDA-1, introduced in 1979, which increased the blood supply and facilitated resource-sharing among blood banks.

== Collection and processing ==
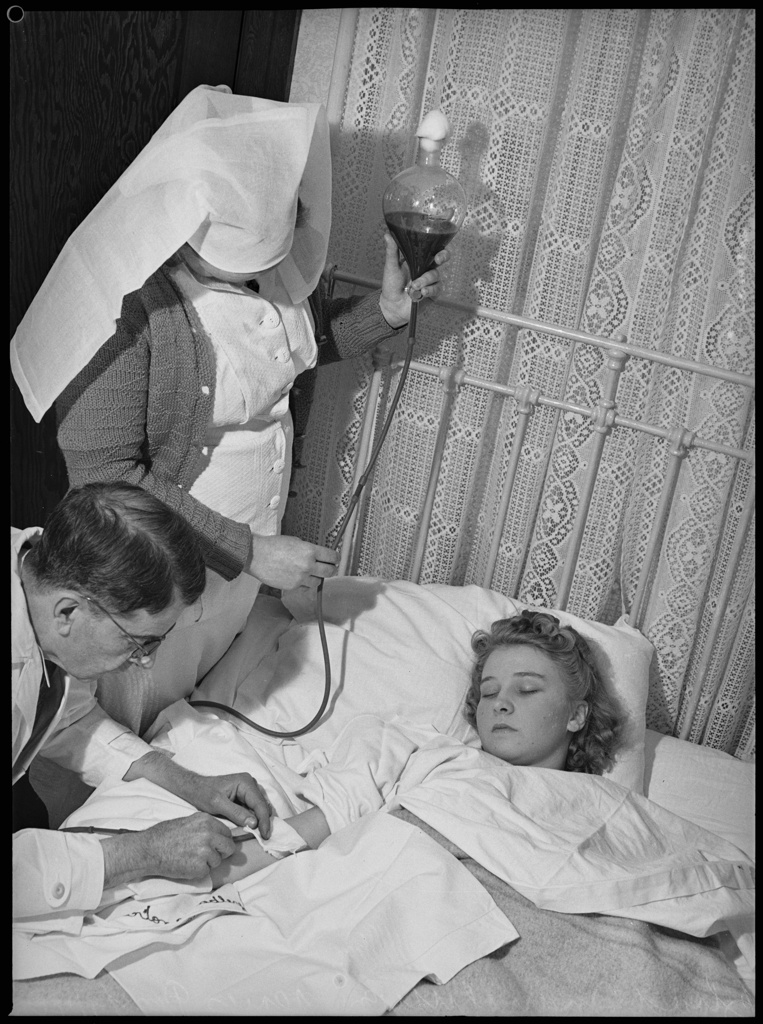
Woman receiving blood donation, Sydney, Australia, 1940

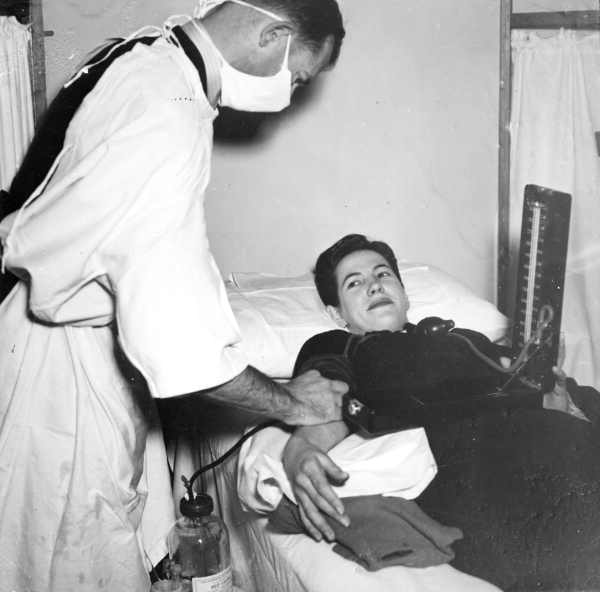
Blood donation at the Royal Melbourne Hospital during the 1940s

In the U.S., certain standards are set for the collection and processing of each blood product. "Whole blood" (WB) is the proper name for one defined product, specifically unseparated venous blood with an approved preservative added. Most blood for transfusion is collected as whole blood. Autologous donations are sometimes transfused without further modification, however whole blood is typically separated (via centrifugation) into its components, with red blood cells (RBC) in solution being the most commonly used product. Units of WB and RBC are both kept refrigerated at 33.8 to 42.8 °F (1.0 to 6.0 °C), with maximum permitted storage periods (shelf lives) of 35 and 42 days respectively. RBC units can also be frozen when buffered with glycerol, but this is an expensive and time-consuming process, and is rarely done. Frozen red cells are given an expiration date of up to ten years and are stored at −85 °F (−65 °C).

The less-dense blood plasma is made into a variety of frozen components, and is labeled differently based on when it was frozen and what the intended use of the product is. If the plasma is frozen promptly and is intended for transfusion, it is typically labeled as fresh frozen plasma. If it is intended to be made into other products, it is typically labeled as recovered plasma or plasma for fractionation. Cryoprecipitate can be made from other plasma components. These components must be stored at 0 °F (−18 °C) or colder, but are typically stored at −22 °F (−30 °C). The layer between the red cells and the plasma is referred to as the buffy coat and is sometimes removed to make platelets for transfusion. Platelets are typically pooled before transfusion and have a shelf life of 5 to 7 days, or 3 days once the facility that collected them has completed their tests. Platelets are stored at room temperature (72 °F or 22 °C) and must be rocked/agitated. Since they are stored at room temperature in nutritive solutions, they are at relatively high risk for growing bacteria.

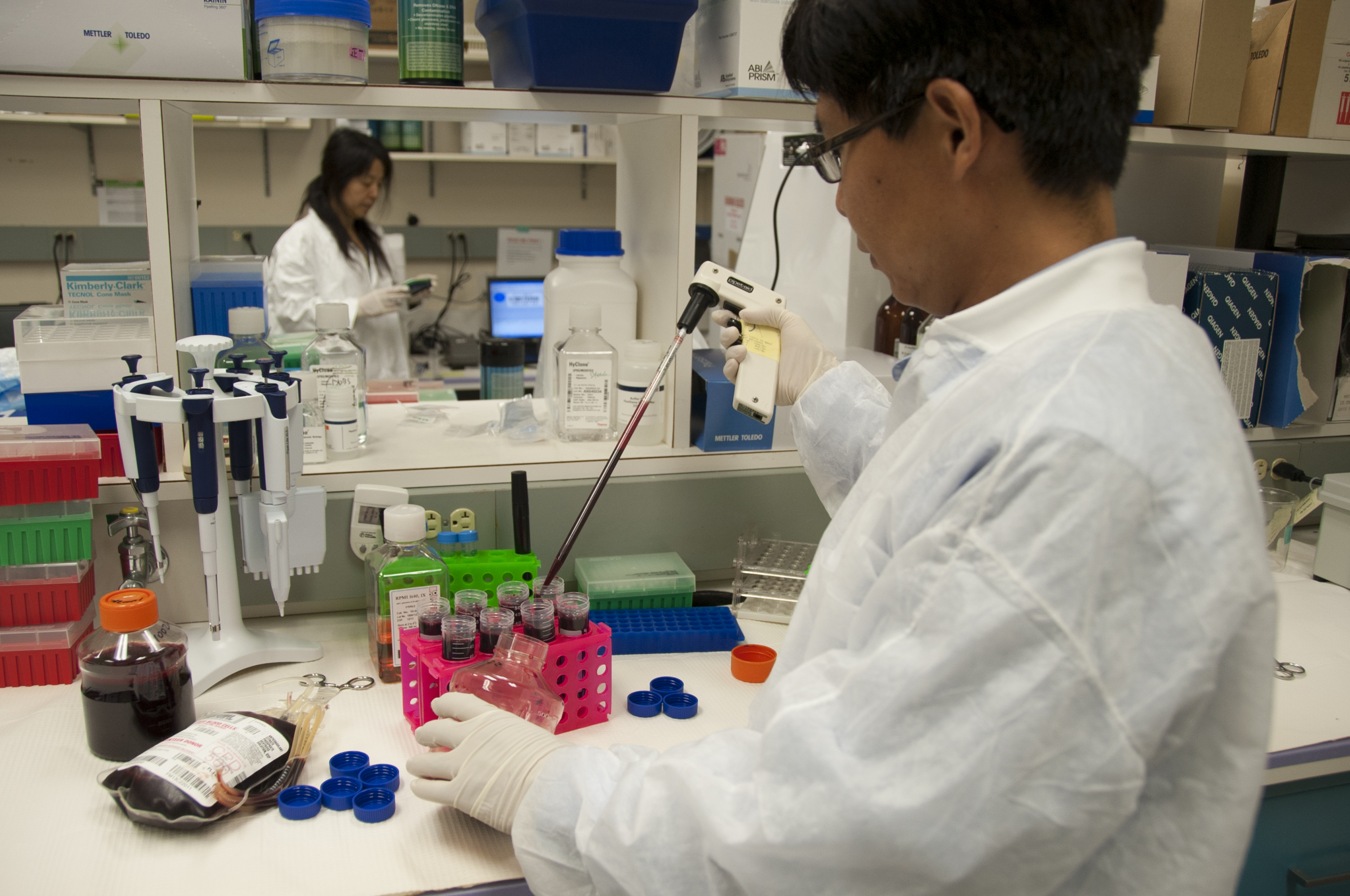
US Food and Drug Administration scientist prepares blood donation samples for testing.

Some blood banks also collect products by apheresis. The most common component collected is plasma via plasmapheresis, but red blood cells and platelets can be collected by similar methods. These products generally have the same shelf life and storage conditions as their conventionally-produced counterparts.

Donors are sometimes paid; in the U.S. and Europe, most blood for transfusion is collected from volunteers while plasma for other purposes may be from paid donors.

Most collection facilities as well as hospital blood banks also perform testing to determine the blood type of patients and to identify compatible blood products, along with a battery of tests (e.g. disease) and treatments (e.g. leukocyte filtration) to ensure or enhance quality. The increasingly recognized problem of inadequate efficacy of transfusion is also raising the profile of RBC viability and quality. Notably, U.S. hospitals spend more on dealing with the consequences of transfusion-related complications than on the combined costs of buying, testing/treating, and transfusing their blood.

== Storage and management ==
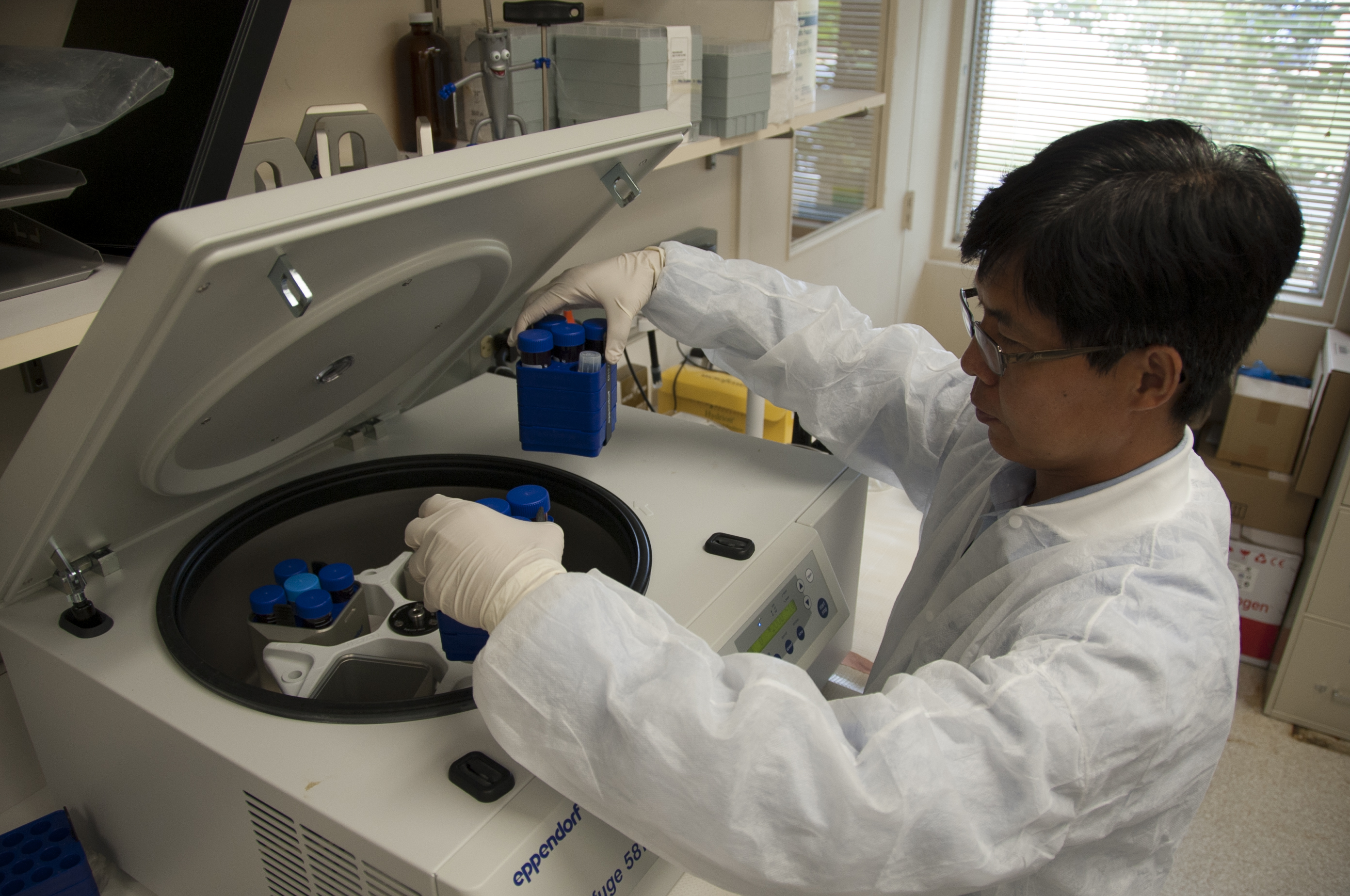
Whole blood is often separated, using a centrifuge, into components for storage and transportation.

Routine blood storage is 42 days or 6 weeks for stored packed red blood cells (also called "StRBC" or "pRBC"), by far the most commonly transfused blood product, and involves refrigeration but usually not freezing. There has been increasing controversy about whether a given product unit's age is a factor in transfusion efficacy, specifically on whether "older" blood directly or indirectly increases risks of complications. Studies have not been consistent on answering this question, with some showing that older blood is indeed less effective but with others showing no such difference; nevertheless, as storage time remains the only available way to estimate quality status or loss, a first-in-first-out inventory management approach is standard presently. It is also important to consider that there is large variability in storage results for different donors, which combined with limited available quality testing, poses challenges to clinicians and regulators seeking reliable indicators of quality for blood products and storage systems.

Transfusions of platelets are comparatively far less numerous, but they present unique storage/management issues. Platelets may only be stored for 7 days, due largely to their greater potential for contamination, which is in turn due largely to a higher storage temperature.

=== RBC storage lesion ===
Insufficient transfusion efficacy can result from red blood cell (RBC) blood product units damaged by so-called storage lesion—a set of biochemical and biomechanical changes which occur during storage. With red cells, this can decrease viability and ability for tissue oxygenation. Although some of the biochemical changes are reversible after the blood is transfused, the biomechanical changes are less so, and rejuvenation products are not yet able to adequately reverse this phenomenon.

Current regulatory measures are in place to minimize RBC storage lesion—including a maximum shelf life (currently 42 days), a maximum auto-hemolysis threshold (currently 1% in the US), and a minimum level of post-transfusion RBC survival in vivo (currently 75% after 24 hours). However, all of these criteria are applied in a universal manner that does not account for differences among units of product; for example, testing for the post-transfusion RBC survival in vivo is done on a sample of healthy volunteers, and then compliance is presumed for all RBC units based on universal (GMP) processing standards. RBC survival does not guarantee efficacy, but it is a necessary prerequisite for cell function, and hence serves as a regulatory proxy. Opinions vary as to the best way to determine transfusion efficacy in a patient in vivo. In general, there are not yet any in vitro tests to assess quality deterioration or preservation for specific units of RBC blood product prior to their transfusion, though there is exploration of potentially relevant tests based on RBC membrane properties such as erythrocyte deformability and erythrocyte fragility (mechanical).

Many physicians have adopted a so-called "restrictive protocol"—whereby transfusion is held to a minimum—due in part to the noted uncertainties surrounding storage lesion, in addition to the very high direct and indirect costs of transfusions, along with the increasing view that many transfusions are inappropriate or use too many RBC units.

=== Platelet storage lesion ===
Platelet storage lesion is a very different phenomenon from RBC storage lesion, due largely to the different functions of the products and purposes of the respective transfusions, along with different processing issues and inventory management considerations.

=== Alternative inventory and release practices ===
Although as noted the primary inventory-management approach is first in, first out (FIFO) to minimize product expiration, there are some deviations from this policy—both in current practice as well as under research. For example, exchange transfusion of RBC in neonates calls for use of blood product that is five days old or less, to "ensure" optimal cell function. Also, some hospital blood banks will attempt to accommodate physicians' requests to provide low-aged RBC product for certain kinds of patients (e.g. cardiac surgery).

More recently, novel approaches are being explored to complement or replace FIFO. One is to balance the desire to reduce average product age (at transfusion) with the need to maintain sufficient availability of non-outdated product, leading to a strategic blend of FIFO with last in, first out (LIFO).

=== Long-term storage ===
"Long-term" storage for all blood products is relatively uncommon, compared to routine/short-term storage. Cryopreservation of red blood cells is done to store rare units for up to ten years. The cells are incubated in a glycerol solution which acts as a cryoprotectant ("antifreeze") within the cells. The units are then placed in special sterile containers in a freezer at very low temperatures. The exact temperature depends on the glycerol concentration.

== See also ==
- Medical technologist
- Phlebotomist
- Blood transfusion
