= Cadaveric blood transfusion =

Transfusion of blood from a dead body to a living person

Cadaveric blood transfusion is the transfusion of blood from a dead body to a living person.

== History ==
In 1929, surgeon Vladimir Shamov of Kharkiv, USSR, reported the experimental use of cadaveric blood and demonstrated the absence of toxicity. Russian surgeon Sergei Yudin pioneered the transfusion of cadaveric blood and performed this successfully for the first time on March 23, 1930. Yudin also reported his first seven clinical transfusions with cadaveric blood at the Fourth Congress of Ukrainian Surgeons at Kharkiv in September 1930. The discovery that cadaveric blood could be stored safely provided time for both serological tests and bacteriological examinations. Cadaveric blood was never used widely, even in Russia. From these studies, however, developed a variety of means and methods for the collection, preservation, and storage of blood for transfusion, all of which may be grouped under the umbrella term "blood bank". Although cadaver blood transfusion did not catch on in the United States, physician Bernard Fantus modified the Soviet idea by preserving blood from healthy, living people. Drawing on earlier work involving preservatives and anticoagulants, Fantus added the element of refrigeration and in 1937 established the first blood bank in the United States at Chicago's Cook County Hospital.
