= Autonomic drug =

Type of substances designed to affect the nervous system

Autonomic drugs are substances that can either inhibit or enhance the functions of the parasympathetic and sympathetic nervous systems. This type of drug can be used to treat a wide range of diseases an disorders, including glaucoma, asthma, and disorders of the urinary, gastrointestinal and circulatory systems.

== Parasympathetic nervous system ==
The parasympathetic nervous system is one of the targets of autonomic drugs. By inhibiting or stimulating this nervous system, therapeutic effects can be achieved.

=== Mechanism of action ===
The activation of the parasympathetic nervous system can bring some major physiological effects, such as a rise in glandular secretion, an increase in contraction of smooth muscle, and a reduction in both heart contractility and heart rate. To achieve the above physiological effects, two types of receptors are involved in neurotransmission, namely nicotinic receptors and muscarinic receptors. These two groups of receptors can bind to the same neurotransmitter, acetylcholine, to relay the neurotransmission in the synapse. At the synapse, acetylcholine is released from the presynaptic neuron. Acetylcholine can either bind to the receptors on the postsynaptic neuron to continue transmission of nerve signals or bind to receptors on tissues of the organ to cause a physiological response. After binding to the receptors, acetylcholine will be degraded to choline and acetate by acetylcholinesterase and this will terminate the action of acetylcholine.

By acting on the receptors and acetylcholinesterase involved in transmission of nerve signals, autonomic drugs can be adopted to stimulate or inhibit the parasympathetic nervous system to achieve therapeutic effects.

Promoting stimulation of the parasympathetic nervous system can be attained by using muscarinic agonists or anticholinesterase drugs. Muscarinic agonists can bind to muscarinic receptors and hence promote the transmission of nerve impulses to organs, facilitating the physiological effects brought by parasympathetic nervous system. Anticholinesterase drugs interact with acetylcholinesterase so as to prevent acetylcholine from binding to acetylcholinesterase. This hinders the decomposition of acetylcholine, maintaining neurotransmission and also the resulting physiological effects.

Inhibition of the parasympathetic nervous system can be achieved by utilizing muscarinic antagonists or inhibitors of acetylcholine release. Muscarinic antagonists can bind to muscarinic receptors and block the receptors. Acetylcholine cannot interact with muscarinic receptors so transmission of nerve impulses cannot be passed from neurons to organs to bring about the original physiological response. For inhibitors of acetylcholine release, they can impede the release of acetylcholine from the presynaptic nerve fibre. In this way, there is a decline in neurotransmission and the corresponding physiological effect will be diminished.

=== Medical uses ===
Autonomic drugs are used clinically to treat diseases that are related to the parasympathetic nervous system.

Chemical structure of bethanechol

==== Bethanechol ====
Bethanechol is a muscarinic agonist. It is included in the therapy for underactive bladder with poor contraction of detrusor muscle. Since contraction of detrusor muscle in the bladder is controlled by the parasympathetic nervous system, Bethanechol can bind to muscarinic receptors to stimulate activation of the parasympathetic nervous system and restore contraction of detrusor muscle. A low dose of Bethanechol is often used in treatment as increasing the dose can cause side effects like nausea, diarrhea and headache.

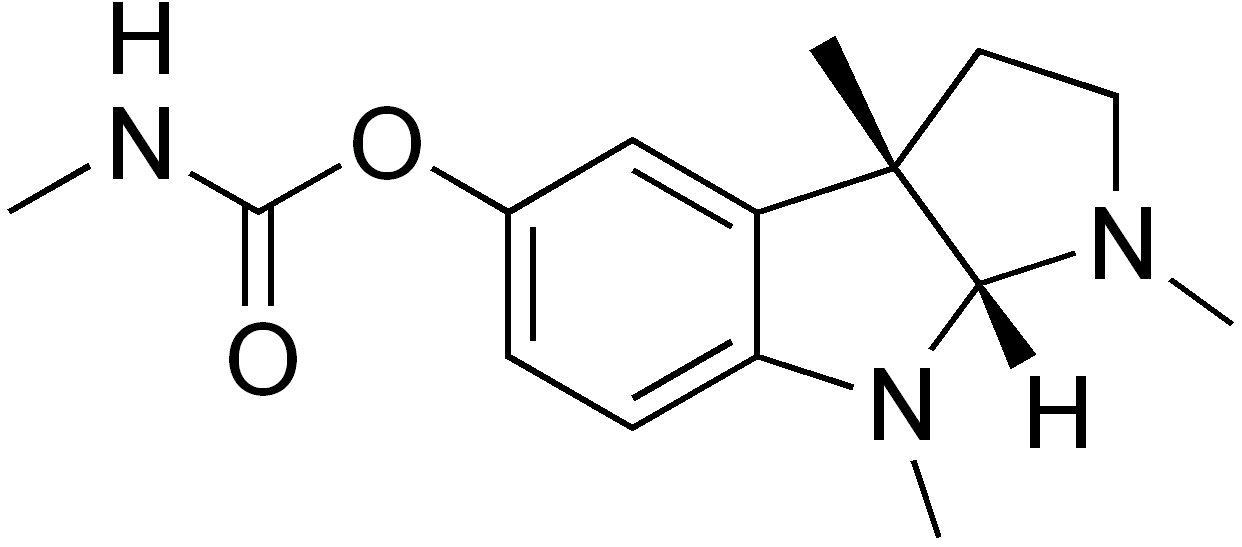
Chemical structure of physostigmine

==== Physostigmine ====
Physostigmine is an anticholinesterase drug and it is used in treating glaucoma. For patients with glaucoma, a rise in intraocular pressure is usually found. Physostigmine can block the action of acetylcholinesterase, reducing disintegration of acetylcholine. There is a higher availability of acetylcholine for supporting neurotransmission in the parasympathetic nervous system, which promotes contraction of smooth muscle in the ciliary body. This results in an increase in outflow of aqueous humor by widening Schlemm's canal and the trabecular meshwork, lowering the intraocular pressure of patients with glaucoma. The use of Physostigmine may bring about several adverse effects, such as an increased spasm of accommodation and cramps in the intestines.

==== Atropine ====
Chemical structure of atropine

Patients with bradycardia are treated with atropine. Atropine is a muscarinic antagonist, which can obstruct the muscarinic receptor and acetylcholine cannot bind to the receptor for sustaining transmission of nerve signals to the heart through the parasympathetic nervous system. This allows an increase in heart rate. Hyperthermia, dilated pupils and dry mouth are side effects associated with the use of atropine.

==== Botulinum toxin A ====
Botulinum toxin A is an example of inhibitors of acetylcholine release, which is a drug for treating overactive bladder. It blocks the release of acetylcholine from the presynaptic neuron and therefore acetylcholine cannot interact with receptors in the postsynaptic neuron to carry on neurotransmission in the parasympathetic nervous system. This results in a decline in contraction of detrusor muscle in the bladder and brings back a normal activity of the bladder. Adopting this therapy to treat overactive bladder can raise the risk of having urinary retention, hematuria and infections in the lower urinary tract.

== Sympathetic nervous system ==
The sympathetic nervous system is another target of autonomic drugs. By stimulating or inhibiting the sympathetic nervous system, therapeutic effects can be achieved.

=== Mechanisms of action ===
==== Sympathetic nervous system ====
The sympathetic nervous system is involved in stimulating the fight-or-flight response of the body. Activating the sympathetic pathway results in physiological effects including the acceleration of heart beat, increase in force of heart contraction, secretion of adrenaline and noradrenaline by the adrenal gland, bronchi relaxation, and the inhibition of peristalsis and gastrointestinal secretions. Neurotransmitters are used to relay neurotransmission in order to bring about these physiological effects. Acetylcholine is a type of neurotransmitter released from the preganglionic nerve which binds to nicotinic receptors in the autonomic ganglion. Noradrenaline is another type of neurotransmitter released from the postganglionic nerve that binds to adrenergic receptors in target tissues of organs to cause physiological responses.

==== Adrenergic receptor ====
Adrenergic receptors are the target of many autonomic drugs that act on the sympathetic nervous system. Adrenergic receptors can mainly be classified into 5 types, known as ⍺1, ⍺2, β1, β2, β3. These adrenergic receptors are located in different tissues and stimulate different physiological responses. ⍺1 receptors are mainly located in smooth muscles, activating them result in vasoconstriction and the constriction of smooth muscles. ⍺2 receptors are mainly located in nerve endings of presynaptic nerve, activating them result in decreased presynaptic noradrenaline release, hence serving as a negative feedback mechanism. β1 receptors are mainly located in the heart, activating them result in increased contractility of the heart, and an increased heart rate. β2 receptors are mainly located in smooth muscles, activating them result in vasodilation and relaxation of smooth muscles, which produces opposing effect with ⍺1 receptor. β3 receptors are mainly located in adipocytes and detrusor muscles of the bladder, activating it result in relaxation of detrusor muscle and also the stimulation of lipolysis, which is a process to breakdown fat molecules into fatty acids as a source of energy.

Drugs affecting the sympathetic nervous system can be divided into 2 main categories: sympathomimetic drugs which mimics the action of sympathetic nervous system activation; and sympatholytic drugs which reduce or interrupt the action of sympathetic nervous system activation.

=== Sympathomimetic drug ===
Sympathomimetic drugs are stimulant compounds which mimic the effects of endogenous agonists of the sympathetic nervous system. The action of sympathomimetic drugs can be classified as direct and indirect action. The direct mode of activating adrenergic receptors involve the mimicking of endogenous molecules through agonist molecules, and the indirect mode of action involve mechanisms of increasing the release, or decreasing the breakdown and removal of noradrenaline.

==== Examples ====
Examples of sympathomimetic drugs
Types	Examples
Non-selective adrenergic agonist	Adrenaline & Noradrenaline
Selective ⍺1 agonist	Phenylephrine
Selective ⍺2 agonist	Clonidine
Selective β1 agonist	Dobutamine
Selective β2 agonist	Terbutaline & salbutamol
Selective β3 agonist	Mirabegron

=== Sympatholytic drug ===
Sympatholytic drugs produce an opposing effect to sympathomimetic drugs. They reduce or inhibit sympathetic nervous system action. The mode of action of sympatholytic drugs includes the direct mode of blocking the activation of adrenoreceptors by receptor antagonist (blocker), and the indirect mode of inhibiting noradrenaline synthesis, storage, and release.

==== Examples ====
Examples of sympatholytic drugs
Types	Examples
Non-selective ⍺-antagonist	Phenoxybenzamine
Selective ⍺1 antagonist	Prazosin, Terazosin, Doxazosin, Tamsulosin
Non-selective β-antagonist	Propranolol, timolol
Selective β1 antagonist	Atenolol, Metoprolol
Inhibit noradrenaline synthesis	Methyldopa

=== Medical uses ===
Major medical use of autonomic drugs acting on the sympathetic nervous system includes the treatment of hypertension, hypotension, asthma, heart failure and angina.

==== Terbutaline ====
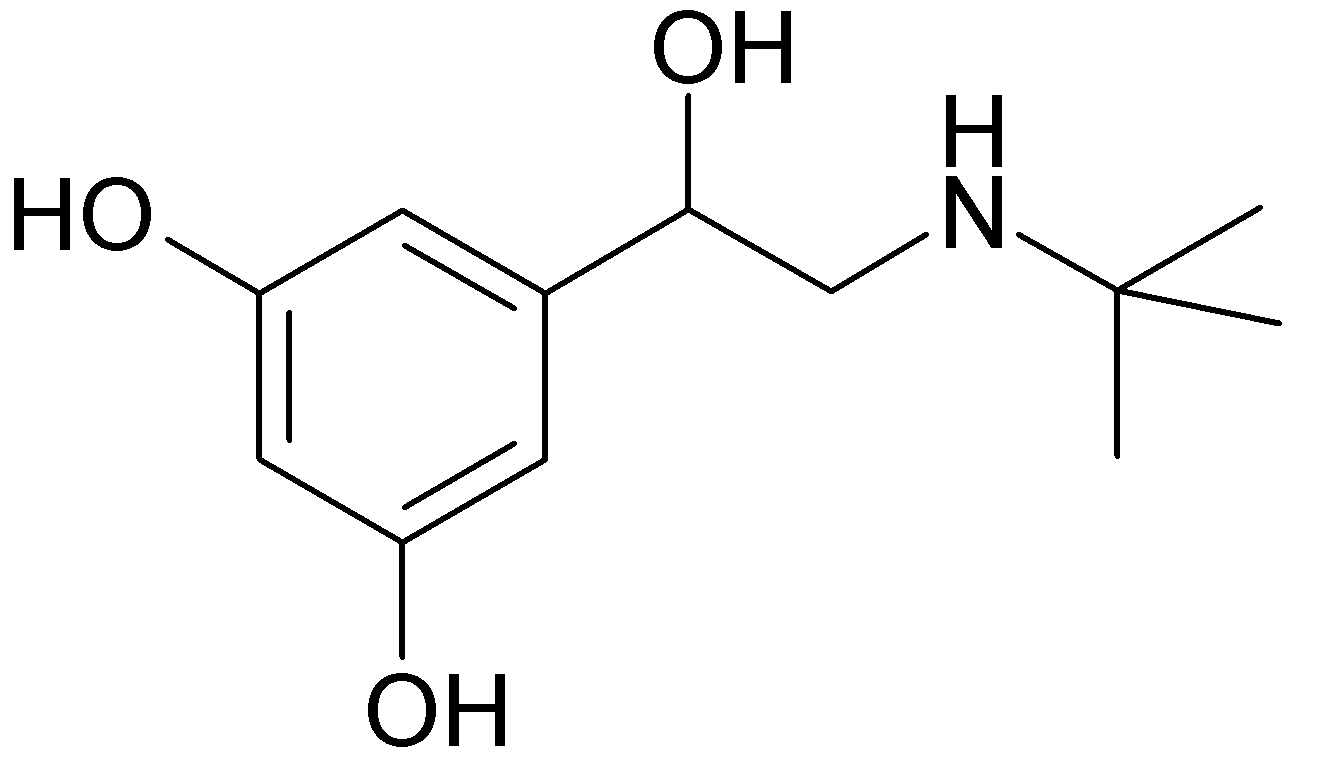
Chemical structure of terbutaline

Terbutaline is a type of sympathomimetic drug. Terbutaline is a selective β2 receptor agonist that is clinically used to treat asthma. Since terbutaline is an agonist selective to β2 receptors, it activates β2 receptors in smooth muscles and stimulates sympathetic responses, including the increased relaxation of smooth muscles. Relaxation of smooth muscles in bronchi and trachea provides the effect of airway widening and hence can be served as a bronchodilator for asthma treatment. As terbutaline is selective to β2 receptors, it has relatively less effect on the heart, preventing heart-related side effects. Side effects of terbutaline includes peripheral vasodilation, tremor due to stimulation of β2 receptors in skeletal muscle, and tachycardia due to slight effect on β1 receptors. Therefore, terbutaline is mostly administered through inhalation to produce localized effect on the lungs, hence reduces side effects. Terbutaline can also be used to prevent premature labour, through the relaxation of uterine smooth muscles.

Chemical structure of atenolol

==== Atenolol ====
Atenolol is a type of sympatholytic drug. Atenolol is a selective β1 antagonist that is clinically used to treat hypertension, angina and cardiac dysrhythmias. Since atenolol is selective to β1 receptor, it only acts on β1 receptors which are located in the heart. As an antagonist, it opposes the effect of sympathetic nervous system activation. Actions of atenolol include the reduction in myocardial contractility and heart rate, hence producing the effect of lowering blood pressure and cardiac output. Side effects of atenolol include cold extremities and exacerbation of cardiac failure, hence this drug is not suitable for patients with heart failure. Since atenolol does not act on β2 receptors, it does not cause bronchoconstriction, therefore allowing asthma patients to use the drug
