= Lawrence Bruce Robertson =

Canadian surgeon during World War I

Lawrence Bruce Robertson was a Canadian surgeon who developed methods for and promoted the use of blood transfusions in battlefield surgery during World War I.

== Early life and education ==
Robertson studied medicine at the University of Toronto, graduating in 1909. He interned at the Hospital for Sick Children in Toronto.

== Career ==
Robertson engaged in post-graduate training in Boston and New York, where he studied methods of blood transfusion at Bellevue Hospital, during a time when the process was not widely accepted for use in surgery. He returned to Canada in 1913, and worked at the Hospital for Sick Children in Toronto, where he introduced the processes he had learned to other physicians. With the advent of war, Robertson enlisted in the armed forces in 1914.

In October 1915, Robertson used the syringe method of transfusion which he had learned in New York to perform a transfusion, providing blood to a patient suffering from shrapnel wounds. After four more successful transfusions over several months, he reported his results to Sir Walter Morley Fletcher, director of the Medical Research Committee. In 1916 he wrote an article for the British Medical Journal detailing his results, titled "The Transfusion of Whole Blood: A Suggestion for More Frequent Employment in War Surgery". This, along with improvements in the process developed by British physician Edward William Archibald, persuaded the British authorities to accept the practice of blood transfusion. In 1917 Robertson set up blood transfusion apparatus at Nomber 2 Casualty Clearing Station in France.

Following the war, Robertson returned to Toronto. In 1920, he was an orthopedic surgeon at Davisville Military Hospital.

Robertson died of pneumonia in 1923 at the age of 38.

== Personal ==
Robertson was married to Enid Gordon (née Finley) Graham, a massage/physical therapist. The couple had two children.
