= Sergei Yudin (surgeon) =

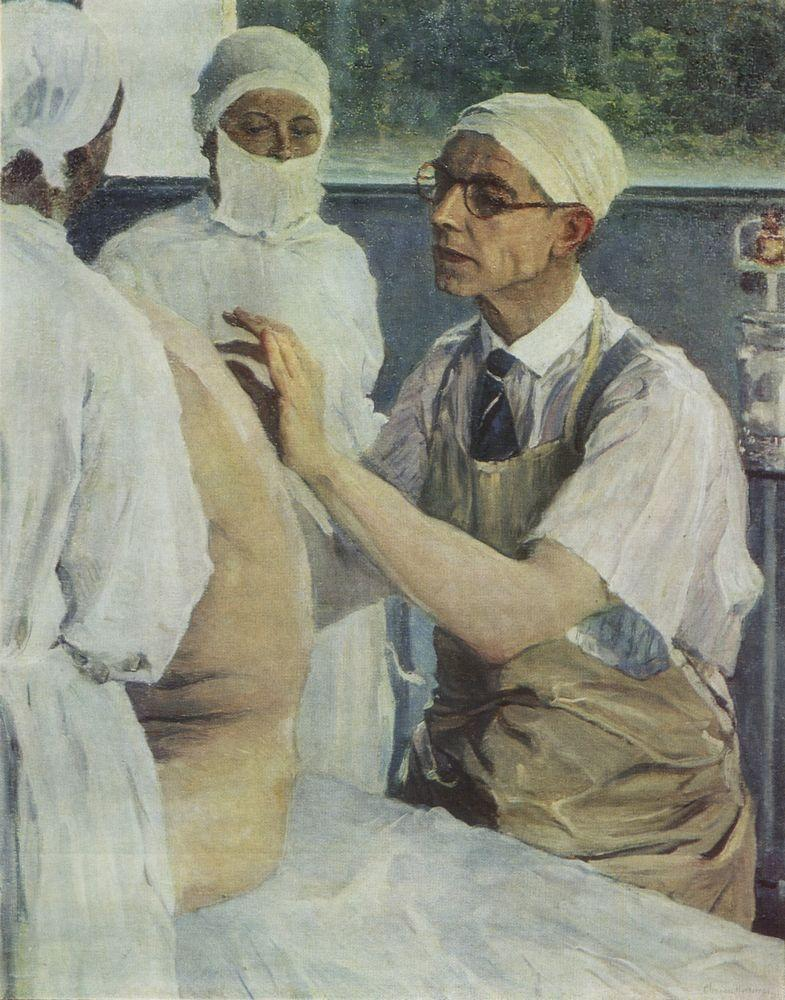
Sergei Yudin; portrait by Mikhail Nesterov (1933)

Sergei Sergeevich Yudin (Russian: Серге́й Серге́евич Ю́дин; 9 October [O.S. 27 September] 1891 – June 12, 1954) was a Russian surgeon.

== Biography ==
Yudin was born in Moscow into the family of a factory owner. In 1911, Yudin became a medical student at the University of Moscow. In the fall of 1914, after the beginning of the First World War, Yudin was called into the army as a junior doctor. During the war, Yudin was wounded three times. He was awarded the Cross of St. George for bravery.

In 1925, Yudin published the book "Spinal Anesthesia". In 1926 this book was awarded the F.A. Rein prize by the All-Soviet Surgical Society for the best surgical publication in 1924–1925. In the same year, Yudin was awarded a trip to the United States for 6 months. Yudin's letters from America were published regularly in 1927–1928 in the leading Soviet surgical journal "New Surgical Archives" and probably represented the most detailed description of American surgery at that time.

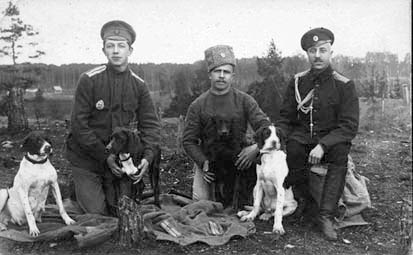
Sergei Yudin (left) with the Dukhovschinsky regiment in 1916.

After returning from the United States, in 1928, Yudin was invited to become chairman of the surgical department at the Institute of Emergency Aid named after N.V. Sklifosovskiy in Moscow. Yudin also pioneered the transfusion of cadaveric blood and performed this successfully for the first time on March 23, 1930. In 1930, Yudin organized the world's first blood bank at the Nikolay Sklifosovskiy Institute, which set an example for the establishment of further blood banks in different regions of the Soviet Union and other countries.

During the Second World War, in June 1942, Yudin was appointed a surgeon-in-chief to the army. In 1943 in recognition of his surgical achievements, Yudin was awarded honorary fellowships of the American College of Surgeons and the Royal College of Surgeons. Yudin was also an honorary member of the International College of Surgeons and the Paris, Prague, and Catalan surgical societies, as well as an honorary doctor of Sorbonne University.

Despite his achievements and popularity, Yudin was arrested by the KGB on December 22, 1948. He was held in jail without trial for more than 3 years. His name disappeared from medical journals, articles he had submitted were not published, and his publications were removed from the libraries. In 1952, he was exiled to Siberia for 10 years to the town of Berdsk, which was 30 km away from Novosibirsk. Only after Joseph Stalin’s death in March 1953, Yudin was able to return to Moscow and recommence his work. One year later on June 12, 1954, Yudin died from myocardial infarction at the age of 62 years.
