= Alfred Benlloch Llorach =

Spanish inventor (1917–2013)

- Born: 17 October 1917; Barcelona
- Died: 8 May 2013 (aged 95)
- Occupation: Inventor
- Parents: Arturo Benlloch Ibañez (father); Elvira Llorach Papasseit (mother)

Alfred Benlloch Llorach (October 17, 1917 – May 8, 2013) was a Spanish inventor with over one hundred patents registered in different areas.

He was born in Barcelona and was one of the pioneers of the first blood transfusion service in the world, created under the direction of Frederic Durán-Jordà during the Spanish Civil War. He also developed pioneering work on artillery predictors, reverse osmosis, transfusion equipment, thermoformed timber, solar energy, and in his last years worked on theoretical physics. He died in Ibiza, aged 95.

== Biography ==
Born in Barcelona on October 17, 1917, in the Round of San Pau 51, son of Arturo Benlloch Ibañez and Elvira Llorach Papasseit, dying her mother's October 28, 1918, due to the so-called Spanish flu along with a sister non nata. His father was a major furniture manufacturer, who had lived a long time in France, and had advanced liberal and social ideas at the time, favoring early on the interest shown by the young Alfred science. Among other things allows you to install a chemical laboratory at home where it experiments in different fields. At age eleven he was a big fan of watching preparations under the microscope and shows passion for physics, chemistry, mineralogy and mechanics.

== The Blood Transfusion Service of Barcelona ==
When the Civil War broke out he was only eighteen, but with a strong scientific background. He met with Dr. Frederic Durán-Jordà by means of a mutual friend and start working with him.

Alfred Benlloch was responsible for designing special devices. He collaborated in research on blood as well as in obtaining products which at the time did not exist in the market, antigens and vaccines. Got a substitute for the Meineke Test with bull myocardium crushed, dried and treated with alcohol, adding a protein and a resin, necessary to detect and discard donors that carriers syphilis. Thanks to its technical input the service was able to process and send the front in three years 9000 liters of blood.

== Postwar ==
After concluding the armed conflict Duran-Jorda was exiled in Britain, Alfred Benlloch return to the University, but he decide to study chemistry instead of medicine. During the Civil War, he developed a predictor for Antiaircraft guns, patented under the euphemistic denomination of "Speed Messurement Device" . Subsequently, the intelligence service of Francoist Spain forced him to travel to Madrid, where he met the caudillo Francisco Franco (1892-1975) and Eduardo González-Gallarza (1898-1986) Minister of Air at that time.

== Reverse osmosis ==
In 1946, he develops tests of Reverse Osmosis, made with different types of semipermeable membranes. During this period he also develops patents relating to automatic changer, blood transfusion equipment, electrostatic toys.

== Solar energy ==
As a consequence of the energy crisis of 1973, Alfred Benlloch began a long series of experiments and patents in the field of solar energy. Numerous patents that lead him to get an independent system design, with low cost and capable of delivering both hot water heating and cooling as well as electricity. The systems allow a working temperature of 220 heat output and over 70% and 31% electric, well above the photovoltaic systems and caloric of the time, and even current.
