= Baroda Medical College =

Medical college in Gujarat, India

Coordinates: 22.3045°N 73.1919°E

Medical College Baroda
- Type: Government
- Established: June 16, 1949; 77 years ago
- Academic affiliations: Maharaja Sayajirao University of Baroda
- Endowment: INR 13.4 million as yearly grant from Government
- Dean: Dr. Dharitri Parmar
- Faculty: 318
- Students: 900; 600 under-graduates 300 post-graduates or residents 250 students entering in 1st year MBBS each year
- Location: Vadodara (Baroda), Gujarat, India
- Campus: Urban
- Website: www.medicalcollegebaroda.edu.in

Baroda Medical College, officially known as Medical College Baroda, is a medical educational institution for undergraduate and postgraduate medical studies that comes under the Faculty of Medicine of the Maharaja Sayajirao University of Baroda. It is located in the Raopura area of Baroda (Vadodara), India. It is primarily affiliated with Sir Sayajirao General Hospital. The college was established in 1949.

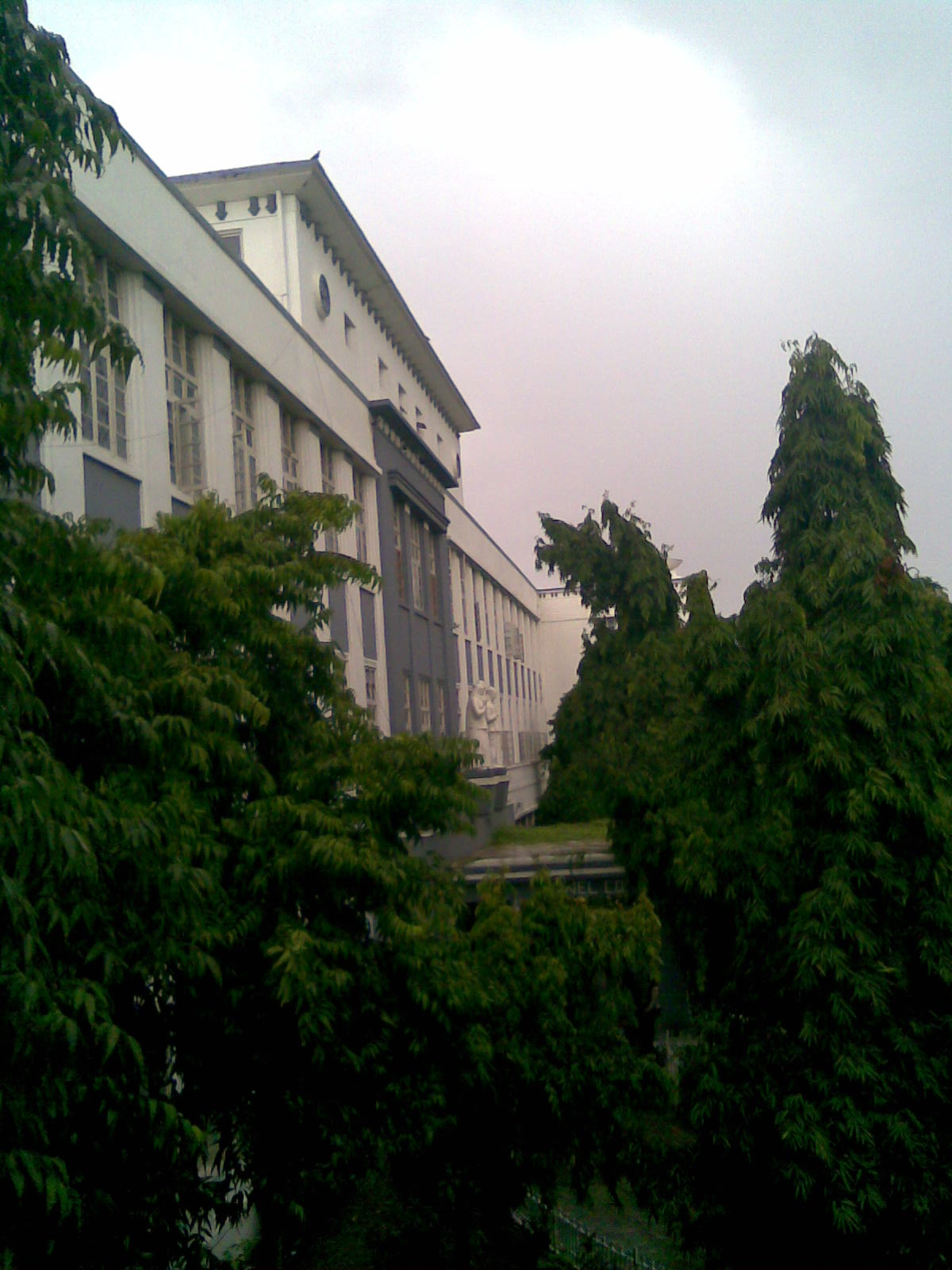

== History ==
Envisaged by the late His Highness Sir Sayajirao Gaekwad III as a seat of learning, Medical College Baroda and Shri Sayajirao General (SSG) Hospital was founded in the city of Vadodara by the late Maharaja of Baroda, Maj. Gen. (Sir) Pratapsingh Gaekwad in January 1946. Due to the efforts of Dr. Jivraj Mehta, the then Advisor to Government of India and Bombay State on Baroda matters, the ground floor was completed in 1949. Dr. M. D. D. Guilder, the Health Minister of Bombay State, inaugurated it on 16 June 1949. The first class was 40 students.

For initial development, the institute was entrusted to the late D. A. N. Deodars – the first Dean and Medical Superintendent of S. S. G. Hospital. The first final MBBS examination was held in April 1954. The Medical Council of India and General Medical Council of Britain recognized the degree awarded. The ruler of Baroda late Sir Sayajirao Gaekwad III initiated medical aid to the public of Baroda by starting a few bedded hospital – Dufferin hospital at Varasia in 1865. That hospital was later expanded to the present S. S. G. Hospital with a capacity of 1500 admissions.

The medical college houses the Departments of Medicine, Social and Preventive Medicine, Biochemistry, Microbiology, Physiology, Anatomy, Pathology, Pharmacology, Forensic medicine, Blood bank, Cytogenetic Laboratory and Ayurvedic Research Unit. Encircling the main college buildings there are separate buildings that house the postmortem room, the physiotherapy college, Departments of Surgery, Pediatrics, Orthopedic, Skin & V. D., Psychiatry and Obstetrics and Gynecology, Radiology, Radiotherapy and Urology.

== Admissions ==
The college follows a quota system in the admission. Annual intake is 250 students who usually start in September. Out of the total, 15% seats are reserved for the All India Quota admissions and 85% are reserved for State Quota admissions among which 49% seats are for combined reservation for Scheduled Castes, Scheduled Tribes, Socially and Educationally Backward Castes while 2% seats are reserved for students with disabilities. The rest are Open seats. The admission is done on a merit wise allotment after students clear the National Eligibility cum Entrance Test (NEET) examination. Allotment of seats is done by the ACPUGMEC for Gujarat state quota seats and by MCC for All India quota seats.

Medical College:-

- First MBBS 1-year duration

Anatomy, Biochemistry, Physiology, Preventive and Social Medicine (PSM)

- Second MBBS 1 year duration

Pathology, Microbiology, Pharmacology, PSM.

- Third MBBS 2 years duration

Part I : Ophthalmology, Otorhinolaryngology, Forensic Medicine, PSM.

Part II : Medicine & allied subjects, Surgery & allied subjects, Obstetrics and Gynaecology, Pediatrics.

From the second MBBS, the students rotate through clinical branches for 142 weeks. A year after the beginning of the third MBBS, the part – 1 examinations in ENT, Ophthalmology, and PSM subjects are taken.

Passing in the first MBBS is essential to continue second MBBS. Passing in the second MBBS is essential for appearing in the Part 1 – third MBBS and passing in the part- I of the third MBBS is essential for appearing in part- II of the third MBBS. This part includes Medicine, Surgery Orthopedics, Pediatrics and Obstetrics & Gynecology. This is followed by one year of rotating internship.

== Alumni ==
- Jatin P. Shah, Elliot W. Strong Chair in Head and Neck Oncology at Memorial Sloan Kettering Cancer Center.
- Nikhil C. Munshi, 1981 graduate, professor at Harvard Medical School and working on multiple myeloma cancer research at Dana-Farber Cancer Institute, recipient of year 2010 Dr. BC Roy award.
- Lalita Ramakrishnan, 1983 graduate, professor of Immunology and Infectious Diseases at the University of Cambridge.
- Jasubhai Keshubhai Desai, (a/k/a Jasu Desai) Michigan doctor finally convicted in 2013 of first degree murder in the 1983 contract killing of his business partner Anna Marie Turetzky. Desai is now serving a life sentence in Macomb Correctional Facility in Lenox Township, Michigan following a protracted legal battle that saw his conviction overturned and reinstated several times and which, at thirty years, is the longest running murder case in Wayne County, Michigan history. The saga and its impact on the families involved has also been followed in detail by the Detroit Free Press.
