= R. Rajalakshmi (scientist) =

Indian biochemist and nutritionist

R. Rajalakshmi (1926–2007) was an Indian biochemist and nutritionist. She developed nutritious, economical diets for Indian families.

== Biography ==
Lakshmi Ramaswami was born in 1926 in Quilon, Kerala to Meenakshi and G.S. Ramaswami. She added Raja to her given name at the age of five and grew up in Madras, where her father was employed as a postal audit officer.

Rajalakshmi attended Wadia College in Pune, earning a mathematics degree in 1945. She taught science in Kanchipuram from 1945 to 1948 and received her teaching certificate from Lady Willingdon Training College in 1949. Rajalakshmi married C. V. Ramakrishnan in 1951. She taught at Annamalai University and earned her MA in philosophy from Banaras Hindu University in 1953. Ramakrishnan became head of the University of Baroda's biochemistry department in 1955. Rajalakshmi earned a PhD in psychology from McGill University in Montreal in 1958. She was mentored by psychologist Donald O. Hebb and finished her PhD in under 18 months. Rajalakshmi was hired by the University of Baroda in 1964. She was part of the foods and nutrition department until 1967 when she joined the biochemistry department. She became a full professor in 1976 and headed the department from 1984 to 1986.

In the early 1960s, Rajalakshmi managed and revised a UNICEF-sponsored nutrition program. At the time and courses in nutrition were based on Western textbooks that included foods that were either expensive or unavailable in India.

With her husband, Rajalakshmi moved to Palo Alto, California in the 1990s to live near her daughter, son-in-law, and grandchildren. She and her relatives moved to Seattle, Washington in 2001. She died there from renal failure in June 2007.

== Personal life ==
Rajalakshmi was married to C. V. Ramakrishnan. They had two children, Nobel Prize-winning structural biologist Venkatraman Ramakrishnan and Cambridge microbiologist Lalita Ramakrishnan.
