= Trisodium citrate =

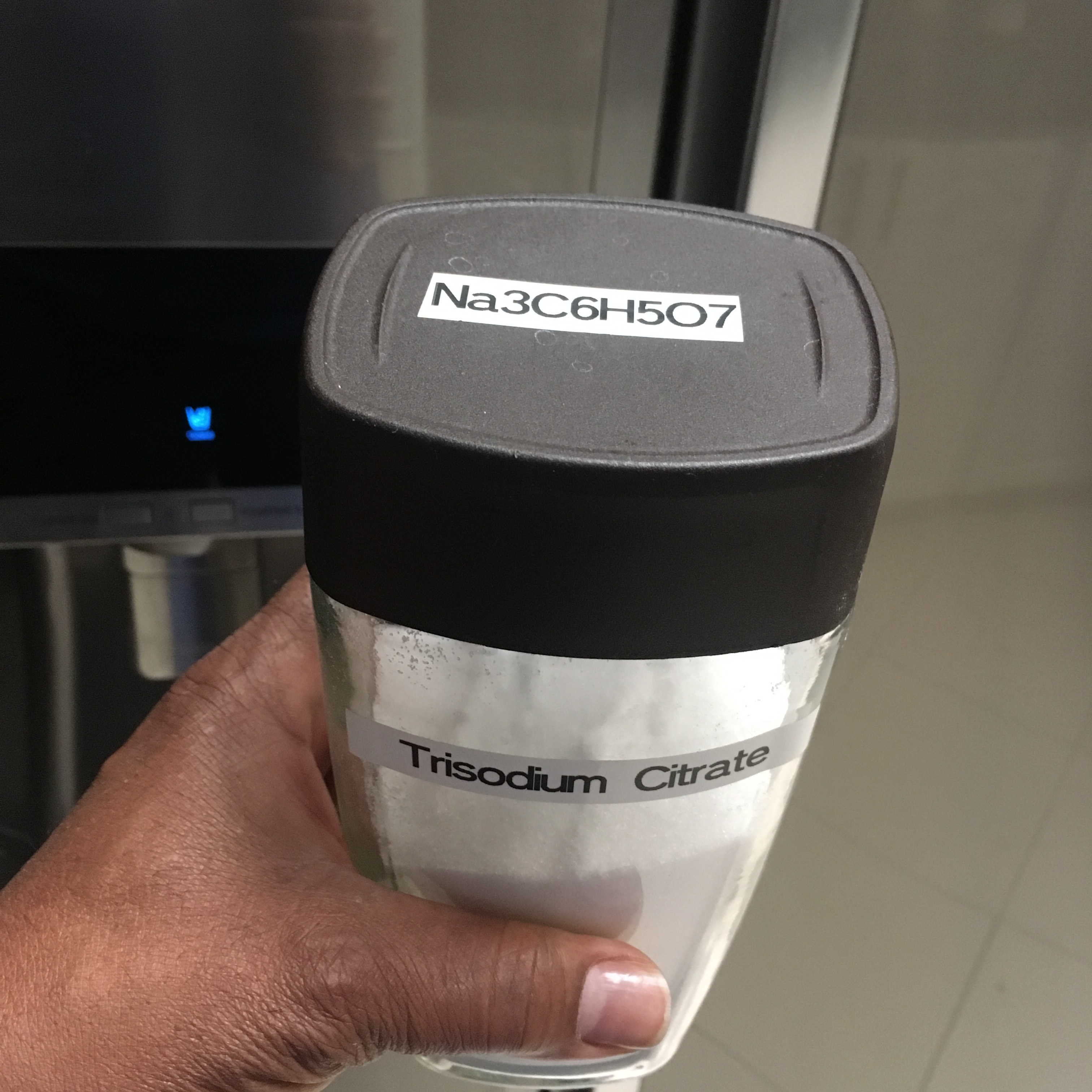

Names
- Preferred IUPAC name Trisodium 2-hydroxypropane-1,2,3-tricarboxylate
- Other names Sodium citrate Trisodium citrate Citrosodine; Trisodium salt E331

Identifiers
CAS Number	68-04-2; 6132-04-3 (dihydrate); 6858-44-2 (pentahydrate)
3D model (JSmol)	Interactive image
ChEMBL	ChEMBL1355
ChemSpider	5989
ECHA InfoCard	100.000.614
E number	E331iii (antioxidants, ...)
PubChem CID	6224
RTECS number	GE8300000
UNII	RS7A450LGA; B22547B95K (dihydrate)
CompTox Dashboard (EPA)	DTXSID2026363
- InChI: InChI=1S/C6H8O7.3Na/c7-3(8)1-6(13,5(11)12)2-4(9)10;;;/h13H,1-2H2,(H,7,8)(H,9,10)(H,11,12);;;/q;3*+1/p-3 Key: HRXKRNGNAMMEHJ-UHFFFAOYSA-K; InChI=1/C6H8O7.3Na/c7-3(8)1-6(13,5(11)12)2-4(9)10;;;/h13H,1-2H2,(H,7,8)(H,9,10)(H,11,12);;;/q;3*+1/p-3 Key: HRXKRNGNAMMEHJ-DFZHHIFOAL
- SMILES: C(C(=O)[O-])C(CC(=O)[O-])(C(=O)[O-])O.[Na+].[Na+].[Na+]

Properties
Chemical formula	Na_{3}C_{6}H_{5}O_{7}
Molar mass	258.06 g/mol (anhydrous), 294.10 g/mol (dihydrate)
Appearance	White crystalline powder
Density	1.7 g/cm^{3}
Melting point	> 300 °C (572 °F; 573 K) (hydrates lose water ca. 150 °C)
Boiling point	Decomposes
Solubility in water	Anhydrous form:57 g/100 g H_{2}O (25 °C) Pentahydrate form: 92 g/100 g H_{2}O (25 °C)

Hazards
- Occupational safety and health (OHS/OSH)
Main hazards	Irritant
NFPA 704 (fire diamond)	1 0 0
- Lethal dose or concentration (LD, LC)
LD_{50} (median dose)	1548 mg/kg (intraperitoneal, rat)
Safety data sheet (SDS)	External MSDS

Related compounds
Related compounds	Monosodium citrate Disodium citrate Calcium citrate Citric acid
- Except where otherwise noted, data are given for materials in their standard state (at 25 °C [77 °F], 100 kPa). verify (what is ?) Infobox references

Trisodium citrate is a chemical compound with the molecular formula Na_{3}C_{6}H_{5}O_{7}. It is sometimes referred to simply as "sodium citrate", though sodium citrate can refer to any of the three sodium salts of citric acid. It possesses a saline, mildly tart taste, and is a mild base.

== Uses ==
=== Foods ===
Sodium citrate is primarily used as a food additive, usually for flavor or as a preservative. Its E number is E331. Sodium citrate is employed as a flavoring agent in certain varieties of club soda. It is common as an ingredient in bratwurst, and is also used in commercial ready-to-drink beverages and drink mixes, contributing a tart flavor. It is found in gelatin mix, ice cream, yogurt, jams, sweets, milk powder, processed cheeses, carbonated beverages, wine, and butter chicken, amongst others.

Sodium citrate can be used as an emulsifying stabilizer when making cheese. It allows the cheese to melt without becoming greasy by stopping the fats from separating. This effect makes cheese particularly suitable as a topping for nachos - coincidentally echoing its chemical formula Na_{3}C_{6}H_{5}O_{7}.

==== Buffering ====
Speciation diagram for a 10-millimolar solution of citric acid. The violet curve corresponds to the trisodium citrate.

As a conjugate base of a weak acid, citrate can perform as a buffering agent or acidity regulator, resisting changes in pH. It is used to control acidity in some substances, such as gelatin desserts. It can be found in the milk minicontainers used with coffee machines. The compound is the product of antacids, such as Alka-Seltzer, when they are dissolved in water. The pH range of a solution of 5 g/100 ml water at 25 °C is 7.5 to 9.0. It is added to many commercially packaged dairy products to control the pH impact of the gastrointestinal system of humans, mainly in processed products such as cheese and yogurt, although it also has beneficial effects on the physical gel microstructure.

=== Chemistry ===
Sodium citrate is a component in Benedict's qualitative solution, often used in organic analysis to detect the presence of reducing sugars such as glucose. It can also be used to prepare inorganic metal citrates such as copper citrate.

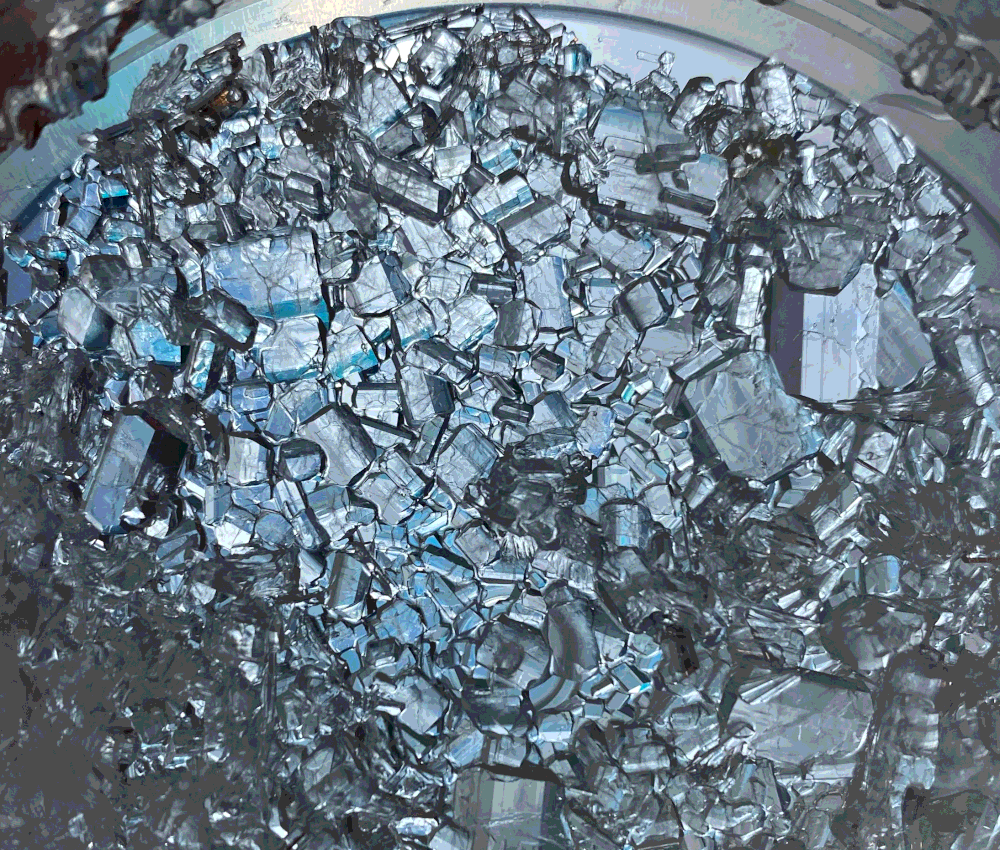
Sodium (tri)citrate, crystallized by evaporation from solution at room temperature.

=== Medicine ===
In 1914, the Belgian doctor Albert Hustin and the Argentine physician and researcher Luis Agote successfully used sodium citrate as an anticoagulant in blood transfusions, with Richard Lewisohn determining its correct concentration in 1915. It continues to be used in blood-collection tubes and for the preservation of blood in blood banks. The citrate ion chelates calcium ions in the blood by forming calcium citrate complexes, disrupting the blood clotting mechanism. Recently, trisodium citrate has also been used as a locking agent in vascath and haemodialysis lines instead of heparin due to its lower risk of systemic anticoagulation.

In 2003, Ööpik et al. showed the use of sodium citrate (0.5 g/kg body weight) improved running performance over 5 km by 30 seconds.

Sodium citrate is used to relieve discomfort in urinary-tract infections, such as cystitis, to reduce the acidosis seen in distal renal tubular acidosis, and can also be used as an osmotic laxative. It is a major component of the WHO oral rehydration solution.

It is used as an antacid, especially prior to anaesthesia, for caesarian section procedures to reduce the risks associated with the aspiration of gastric contents.

=== Boiler descaling ===
Sodium citrate is a particularly effective agent for removal of carbonate scale from boilers without removing them from operation and for cleaning automobile radiators.

== See also ==
- Monosodium citrate
- Disodium citrate
- Citric acid
