= Blood donation =

Blood withdrawal for use by another person via transfusion

Blood donation pictogram

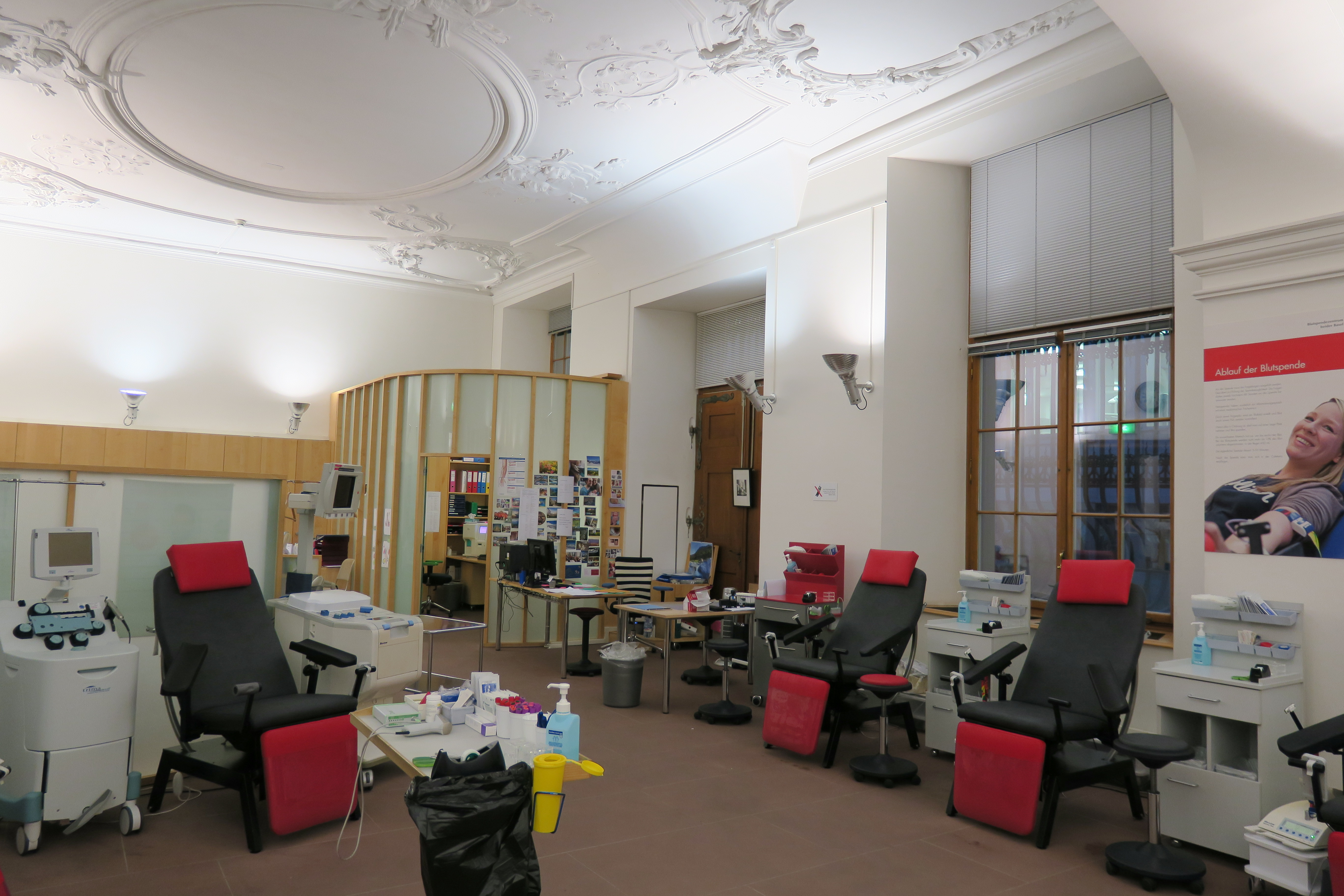
Blood donation center at the University Hospital of Basel, Switzerland. From left to right: Two cell separators for apheresis, secluded office for pre-donation blood pressure measurement and blood count, and on the right, chairs for whole blood donations.

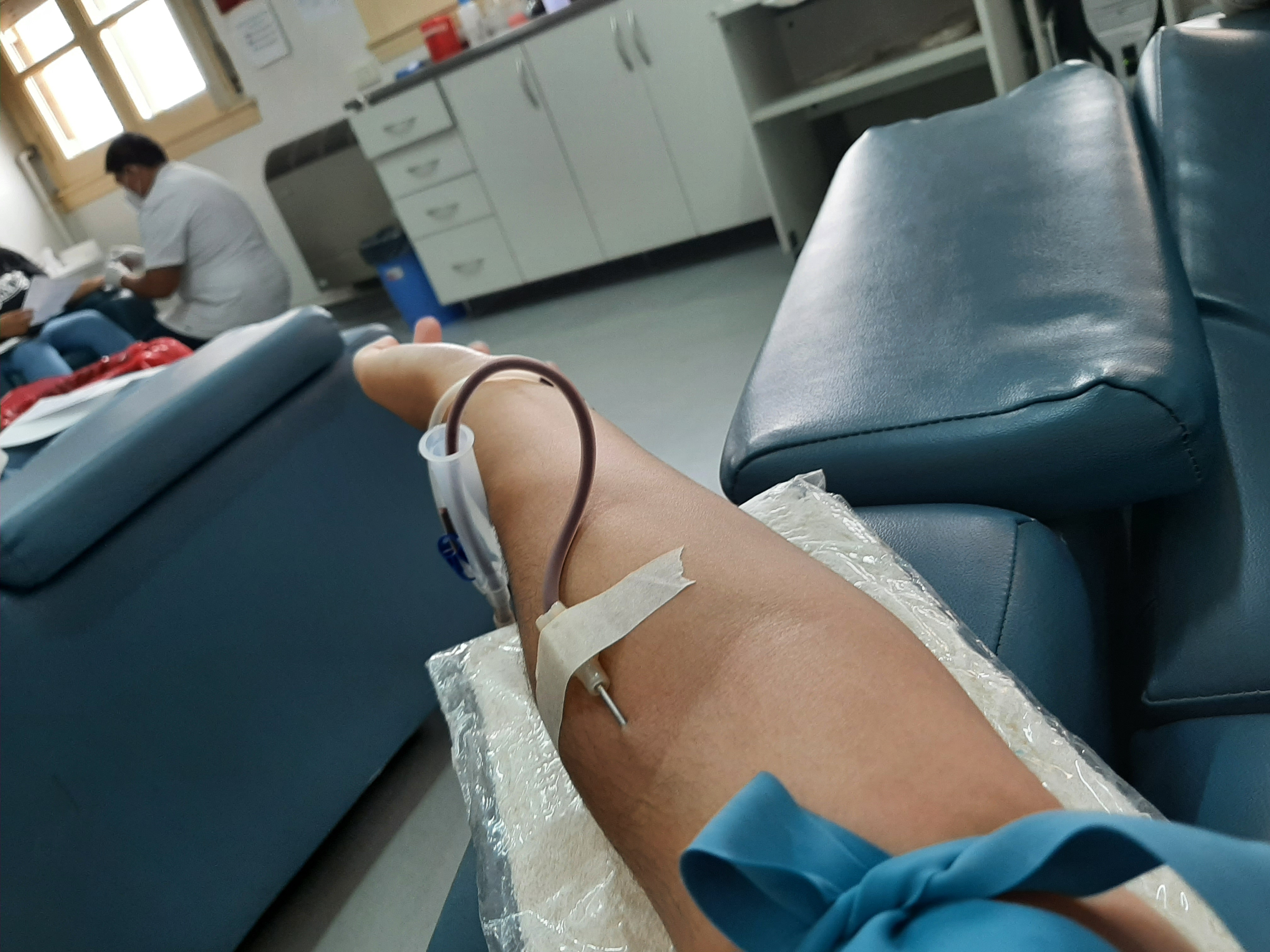
A patient donating blood at a Blood Bank in Córdoba, Argentina

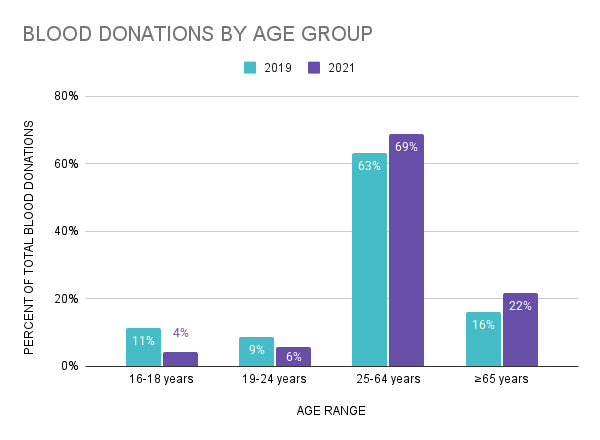
Most blood donations are made by middle aged people.

A blood donation occurs when a person voluntarily has blood drawn and used for transfusions or made into blood products and biopharmaceutical medications by a process called fractionation (separation of whole blood components). A donation may be of whole blood, or of specific components directly (apheresis). Blood banks often participate in the collection process as well as the procedures that follow it.

In the developed world, most blood donors are unpaid volunteers who donate blood for a community supply. In some countries, established supplies are limited and donors usually give blood when family or friends need a transfusion (directed donation). Many donors donate for several reasons, such as a form of charity, general awareness regarding the demand for blood, increased confidence in oneself, helping a personal friend or relative, and social pressure. Despite the many reasons that people donate, not enough potential donors actively donate. However, this is reversed during disasters when blood donations increase, often creating an excess supply that will have to be later discarded. In countries that allow paid donation some people are paid, and in some cases there are incentives other than money such as paid time off from work. People can also have blood drawn for their own future use (autologous donation). Donating is relatively safe, but some donors have bruising where the needle is inserted or may feel faint.

Potential donors are evaluated for anything that might make their blood unsafe to use. The screening includes testing for diseases that can be transmitted by a blood transfusion, including HIV and viral hepatitis. The donor must also answer questions about medical history and take a short physical examination to make sure the donation is not hazardous to their health. How often a donor can donate varies from days to months based on what component they donate and the laws of the country where the donation takes place. For example, in the United States, donors must wait 56 days (eight weeks) between whole-blood donations but only seven days between platelet apheresis donations and twice per seven-day period in plasmapheresis.

The amount of blood drawn and the methods vary. The collection can be done manually or with automated equipment that takes only specific components of the blood. Most of the components of blood used for transfusions have a short shelf life, and maintaining a constant supply is a persistent problem. This has led to some increased interest in autotransfusion, whereby a patient's blood is salvaged during surgery for continuous reinfusion—or alternatively, is self-donated prior to when it will be needed. Generally, the notion of donation does not refer to giving to one's self, though in this context it has become somewhat acceptably idiomatic.

== History ==
The first non-direct transfusion was performed on March 27, 1914, by the Belgian doctor Albert Hustin, though this was a diluted solution of blood. The Argentine doctor Luis Agote used a much less diluted solution in November of the same year. Both used sodium citrate as an anticoagulant.

The world's first blood donor service was established in 1921 by the secretary of the British Red Cross, Percy Lane Oliver. Volunteers were subjected to a series of physical tests to establish their blood group. The London Blood Transfusion Service was free of charge and expanded rapidly. By 1925, it was providing services for almost 500 patients and it was incorporated into the structure of the British Red Cross in 1926. Similar systems were established in other cities including Sheffield, Manchester and Norwich, and the service's work began to attract international attention. Similar services were established in France, Germany, Austria, Belgium, Australia and Japan.

In 1937 Bernard Fantus, director of therapeutics at the Cook County Hospital in Chicago, established one of the first hospital blood banks in the United States. In creating a hospital laboratory that preserved, refrigerated and stored donor blood, Fantus originated the term "blood bank". Within a few years, hospital and community blood banks were established across the United States.

== Types of donation ==
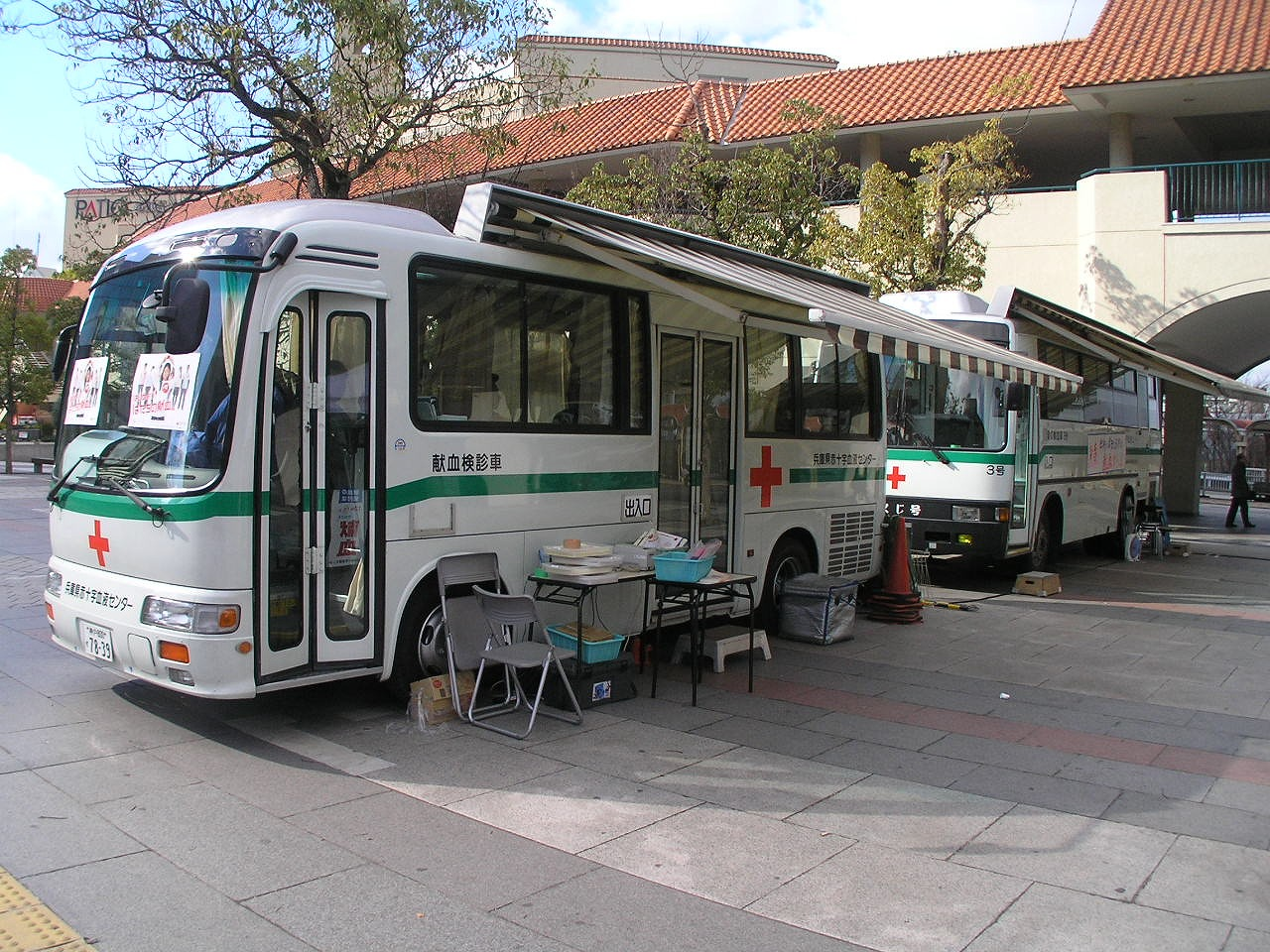
A blood collection bus (bloodmobile) from Japanese Red Cross at Myōdani Station in Suma-ku, Kobe, Hyōgo Prefecture, Japan

Blood donations are divided into groups based on who will receive the collected blood. An allogeneic (also called homologous) donation is when a donor gives blood for storage at a blood bank for transfusion to an unknown recipient. A directed donation is when a person, often a family member, donates blood for transfusion to a specific individual. Directed donations are relatively rare when an established supply exists. A replacement donor donation is a hybrid of the two and is common in developing countries. In this case, a friend or family member of the recipient donates blood to replace the stored blood used in a transfusion, ensuring a consistent supply. When a person has blood stored that will be transfused back to the donor at a later date, usually after surgery, that is called an autologous donation. Blood that is used to make medications can be made from allogeneic donations or from donations exclusively used for manufacturing.

Sometimes there are specific reasons for preferring one form or the other. Allogeneic donations have a lower risk of some complications than blood from a family member. Neonatal alloimmune thrombocytopenia may require a transfusion from the mother's own platelets. Autologous (self) donations may be preferred for someone with a rare blood type for a planned surgery.

Blood is sometimes collected using similar methods for therapeutic phlebotomy, similar to the ancient practice of bloodletting, which is used to treat conditions such as hereditary hemochromatosis or polycythemia vera. This blood is sometimes treated as a blood donation, but may be immediately discarded if it cannot be used for transfusion or further manufacturing.

The actual process varies according to the laws of the country, and recommendations to donors vary according to the collecting organization. The World Health Organization gives recommendations for blood donation policies, but in developing countries many of these are not followed. For example, the recommended testing requires laboratory facilities, trained staff, and specialized reagents, all of which may be unavailable or unaffordable in developing countries.

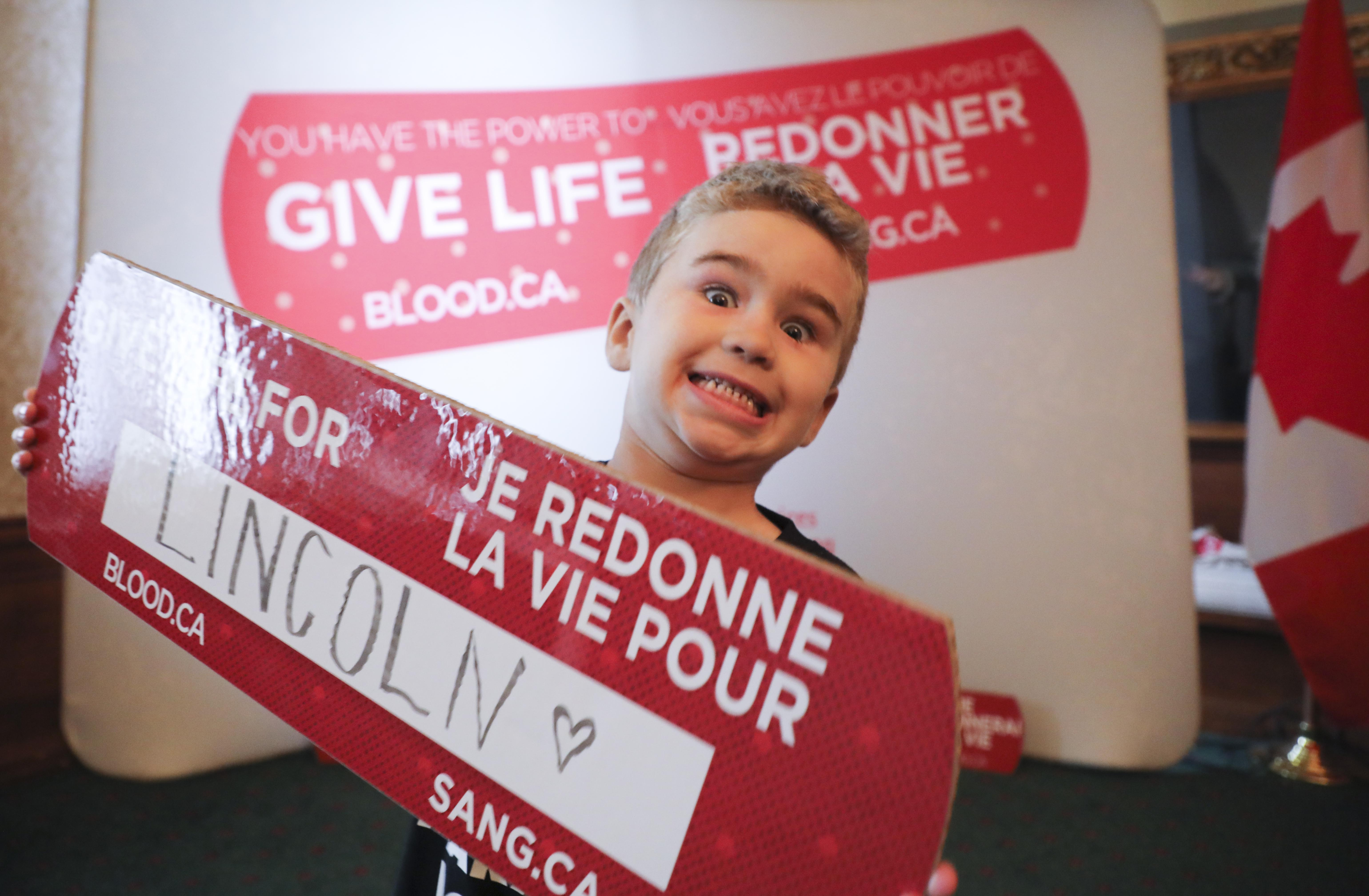
Blood donation campaigns are events that allow people to donate blood at schools, churches, and other community locations.

A blood drive or a blood donor session is an event in which donors come to donate allogeneic blood. These can occur at a blood bank, but they are often set up at a location in the community, such as a shopping center, workplace, school, or house of worship.

== Screening ==
Donors are typically required to give consent for the process, and meet a certain criteria such as weight and hemoglobin levels, and this requirement means minors cannot donate without permission from a parent or guardian. In some countries, answers are associated with the donor's blood, but not name, to provide anonymity; in others, such as the United States, names are kept to create lists of ineligible donors. If a potential donor does not meet these criteria, they are 'deferred'. This term is used because many donors who are ineligible may be allowed to donate later. Blood banks in the United States may be required to label the blood if it is from a therapeutic donor, so some do not accept donations from donors with any blood disease. Others, such as the Australian Red Cross Blood Service, accept blood from donors with hemochromatosis. It is a genetic disorder that does not affect the safety of the blood.

The donor's race or ethnic background is sometimes important since certain blood types, especially rare ones, are more common in certain ethnic groups. Historically, in the United States donors were segregated or excluded on race, religion, or ethnicity, but this is no longer a standard practice.

=== Recipient safety ===
Blood donation policies for men who have sex with men

Blood donation policies for female sex partners of men who have sex with men – Female sex partners of men who have sex with men may donate blood; No deferral – Female sex partners of men who have sex with men may donate blood; Temporary deferral – Female sex partners of men who have sex with men may not donate blood; Permanent deferral – No Data

Donors are screened for health risks that could make the donation unsafe for the recipient. Some of these restrictions are controversial, such as restricting donations from men who have sex with men (MSM) because of the risk of transmitting HIV. In 2011, the UK (excluding Northern Ireland) reduced its blanket ban on MSM donors to a narrower restriction which only prevents MSM from donating blood if they have had sex with other men within the past year. A similar change was made in the US in late 2015 by the Food and Drug Administration (FDA). In 2017, the UK and US further reduced their restrictions to three months. In 2023, the FDA announced new policies easing restrictions on gay and bisexual men donating blood. These updated guidelines stipulate that men in monogamous relationships with other men, or who have not recently had sex, can donate. Individuals who report having sex with people who are HIV positive or have had sex with a new partner who has engaged in anal sex are still barred from blood donation. Autologous donors are not always screened for recipient safety problems since the donor is the only person who will receive the blood. Since the donated blood may be given to pregnant women or women of child-bearing age, donors taking teratogenic (birth defect-causing) medications are deferred. These medications include acitretin, etretinate, isotretinoin, finasteride, and dutasteride.

Donors are examined for signs and symptoms of diseases that can be transmitted in a blood transfusion, such as HIV, malaria, and viral hepatitis. Screening may include questions about risk factors for various diseases, such as travel to countries at risk for malaria or variant Creutzfeldt–Jakob disease (vCJD). These questions vary from country to country. For example, while blood centers in Québec and the rest of Canada, Poland, and many other places defer donors who lived in the United Kingdom for risk of vCJD, donors in the United Kingdom are only restricted for vCJD risk if they have had a blood transfusion in the United Kingdom. Australia removed its UK-donor deferral in July 2022.

Directed donations from family members (e.g., a father donating blood to his child) carry extra risks for the recipient. Any blood transfusion carries some risk of a transfusion reaction, but between genetically related family members, there are additional risks. The donated blood must be irradiated to prevent a potentially deadly graft-versus-host disease, which is more likely between genetically related people. Not all healthcare facilities have the equipment to do this on site. Alloimmunization is a particular risk for directed granulocyte donations. It is a common misconception that directed donations are safer for the recipient; however, family members and close friends, especially parents who have not previously donated blood, frequently feel pressured into lying about disqualifying risk factors (e.g., drug use or prior sexual relationships) and their eligibility, which can result in a higher risk of infection with bloodborne pathogens. Additionally, in the less common case of a person with leukemia or other bone marrow disease, a familial blood transfusion can trigger the production of alloantibodies against HLA proteins, which can cause a bone marrow transplant from that donor to fail in the future. (Closely related family members are usually the best match for a bone marrow transplant.) A directed donation from an unrelated friend, however, would not have the same risk.

=== Donor safety ===
The donor is also examined and asked specific questions about their medical history to make sure that donating blood is not hazardous to their health. The donor's hematocrit or hemoglobin level is tested to make sure that the loss of blood will not make them anemic, and this check is the most common reason that a donor is ineligible. Accepted hemoglobin levels for blood donations, by the American Red Cross, is 12.5g/dL (for females) and 13.0g/dL (for males) to 20.0g/dL, anyone with a higher or lower hemoglobin level cannot donate. Pulse, blood pressure, and body temperature are also evaluated. Elderly donors are sometimes also deferred on age alone because of health concerns. In addition to age, weight and height are important factors when considering the eligibility for donors. For example, the American Red Cross requires a donor to be 110 pounds (50 kg) or more for whole blood and platelet donation and at least 130 pounds (59 kg) (males) and at least 150 pounds (68 kg) (females) for power red donations (double red erythrocytapheresis). The safety of donating blood during pregnancy has not been studied thoroughly, and pregnant women are usually deferred until six weeks after the pregnancy. Donors with aortic stenosis have traditionally been deferred out of concern that the acute volume depletion (475 mL) of blood donation might compromise cardiac output.

=== Blood testing ===
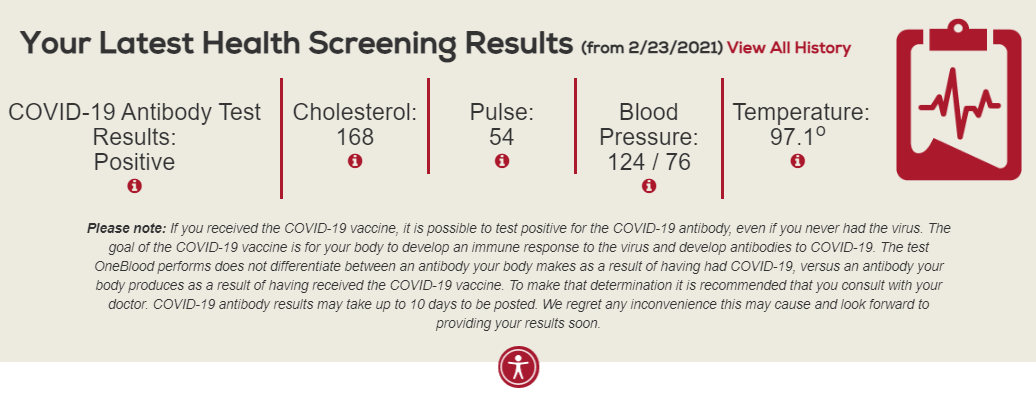
A patient's health screening report given after a blood donation

The donor's blood type must be determined if the blood will be used for transfusions. The collecting agency usually identifies whether the blood is type A, B, AB, or O and the donor's Rh (D) type and will screen for antibodies to less common antigens. More testing, including a crossmatch, is usually done before a transfusion. Type O negative is often cited as the "universal donor" but this only refers to red cell and whole blood transfusions. For plasma and platelet transfusions the system is reversed: AB positive is the universal platelet donor type while both AB positive and AB negative are universal plasma donor types.

Most blood is tested for diseases, including some STDs. The tests used are high-sensitivity screening tests and no actual diagnosis is made. Some of the test results are later found to be false positives using more specific testing. False negatives are rare, but donors are discouraged from using blood donation for the purpose of anonymous STD screening because a false negative could mean a contaminated unit. The blood is usually discarded if these tests are positive, but there are some exceptions, such as autologous donations. The donor is generally notified of the test result.

Donated blood is tested by many methods, but the core tests recommended by the World Health Organization are these four:

- Hepatitis B surface antigen
- Antibody to hepatitis C
- Antibody to HIV, usually subtypes 1 and 2
- Serologic test for syphilis

The WHO reported in 2006 that 56 out of 124 countries surveyed did not use these basic tests on all blood donations.

A variety of other tests for transfusion transmitted infections are often used based on local requirements. Additional testing is expensive, and in some cases the tests are not implemented because of the cost. These additional tests include other infectious diseases such as West Nile fever and babesiosis. Sometimes multiple tests are used for a single disease to cover the limitations of each test. For example, the HIV antibody test will not detect a recently infected donor, so some blood banks use a p24 antigen or HIV nucleic acid test in addition to the basic antibody test to detect infected donors. Cytomegalovirus is a special case in donor testing in that many donors will test positive for it. The virus is not a hazard to a healthy recipient, but it can harm infants and other recipients with weak immune systems.

Blood testing in the US takes at least 48 hours. Because of the time required for testing, directed donations are not practical in emergencies.

== Obtaining the blood ==
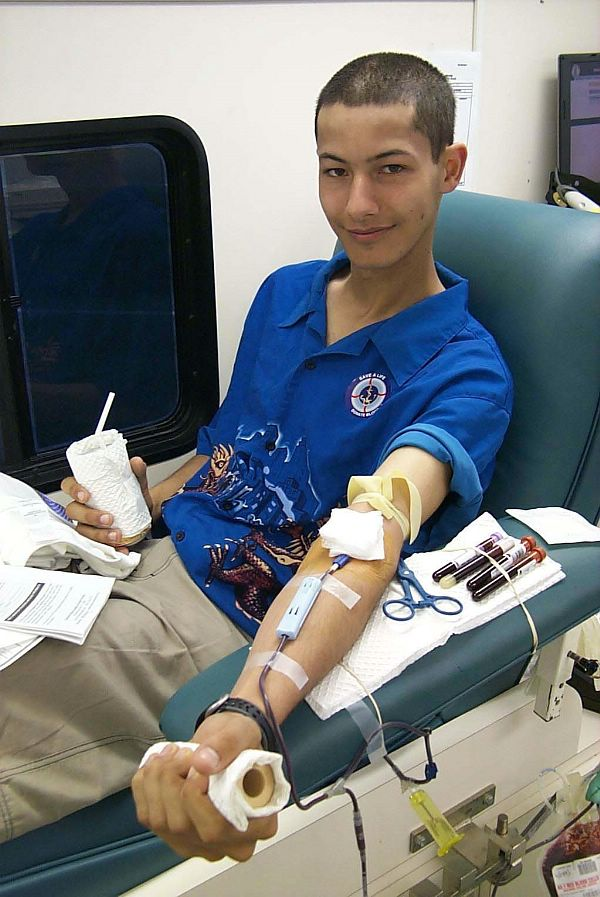
A US Navy sailor donating blood

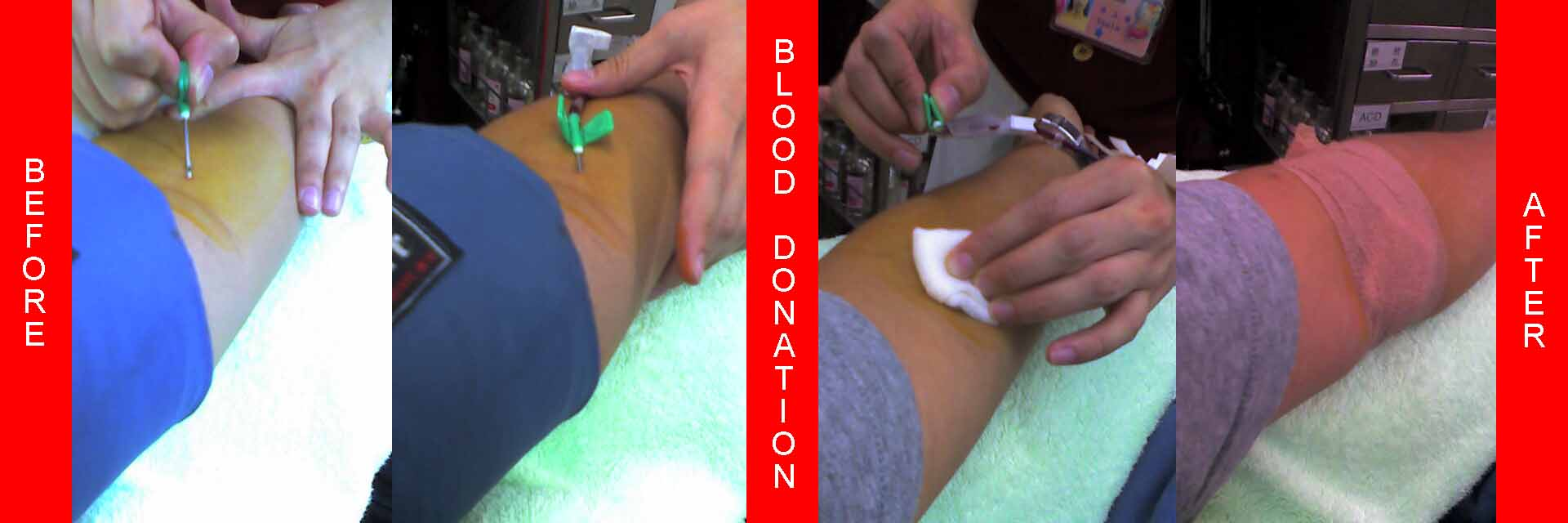
A donor's arm at various stages of donation. The two photographs on the left show a blood pressure cuff being used as a tourniquet.

There are two main methods of obtaining blood from a donor. The most frequent is to simply take the blood from a vein as whole blood. This blood is typically separated into parts, usually red blood cells and plasma, since most recipients (other than trauma patients) need only a specific component for transfusions.

The amount of blood donated in one session – generally called a "unit" – is defined by the WHO as 450 milliliters (15 U.S. fl oz). Some countries like Canada follow this standard, but others have set their own rules, and sometimes there is variation even among different agencies within a country. For example, whole blood donations in the United States are in the 460–500 mL range, while those in the EU must be in the 400–500 mL range. Other countries have smaller units – India uses 350 mL, Singapore 350 or 450 mL, and Japan 200 or 400 mL. Historically, donors in the People's Republic of China would donate only 200 mL, though larger 300 and 400 mL donations have become more common, particularly in northern China and for heavier donors. In any case, an additional 5–10 mL of blood may be collected separately for testing.

The other method is to draw blood from the donor, separate it using a centrifuge or a filter, store the desired part, and return the rest to the donor. This process is called apheresis, and it is often done with a machine specifically designed for this purpose. This process is especially common for plasma, platelets, and red blood cells.

For direct transfusions a vein can be used but the blood may be taken from an artery instead. In this case, the blood is not stored, but is pumped directly from the donor into the recipient. This was an early method for blood transfusion and is rarely used in modern practice. It was phased out during World War II because of problems with logistics, and doctors returning from treating wounded soldiers set up banks for stored blood when they returned to civilian life.

=== Site preparation and drawing blood ===
Insertion of a butterfly needle into a vein to begin the blood draw process

The blood is drawn from a large arm vein close to the skin, usually the median cubital vein on the inside of the elbow. The skin over the blood vessel is cleaned with an antiseptic such as iodine or chlorhexidine to prevent skin bacteria from contaminating the collected blood and also to prevent infections where the needle pierced the donor's skin.

A large needle (16 to 17 gauge) is used to minimize shearing forces that may physically damage red blood cells as they flow through the needle. A tourniquet is sometimes wrapped around the upper arm to increase the pressure of the blood in the arm veins and speed up the process. The donor may also be prompted to hold an object and squeeze it repeatedly to increase the blood flow through the vein.

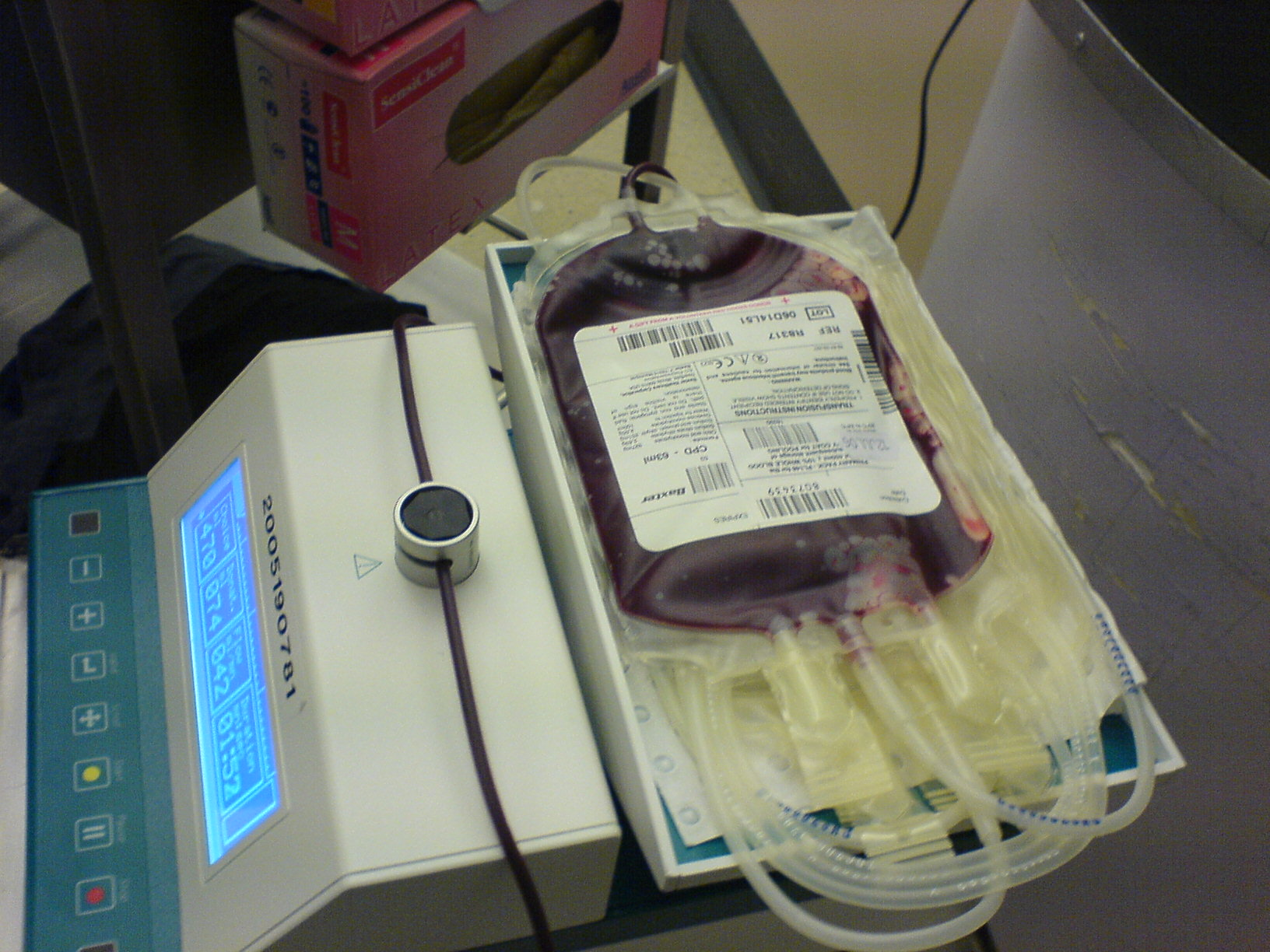
A mechanical tray agitates the bag to mix the blood with anticoagulants and prevent clotting.

=== Whole blood ===
The most common method is collecting the blood from the donor's vein into a container. The amount of blood drawn varies from 200 milliliters (6.8 U.S. fl oz) to 550 milliliters (19 U.S. fl oz) depending on the country, but 450 milliliters (15 U.S. fl oz) is typical. The blood is usually stored in a flexible plastic bag that also contains sodium citrate, phosphate, dextrose, and adenine. This combination keeps the blood from clotting and preserves it during storage up to 42 days. Other chemicals are sometimes added during processing.

The plasma from whole blood can be used to make plasma for transfusions or it can also be processed into other medications using a process called fractionation. This was a development of the dried plasma used to treat the wounded during World War II and variants on the process are still used to make a variety of other medications.

=== Apheresis ===
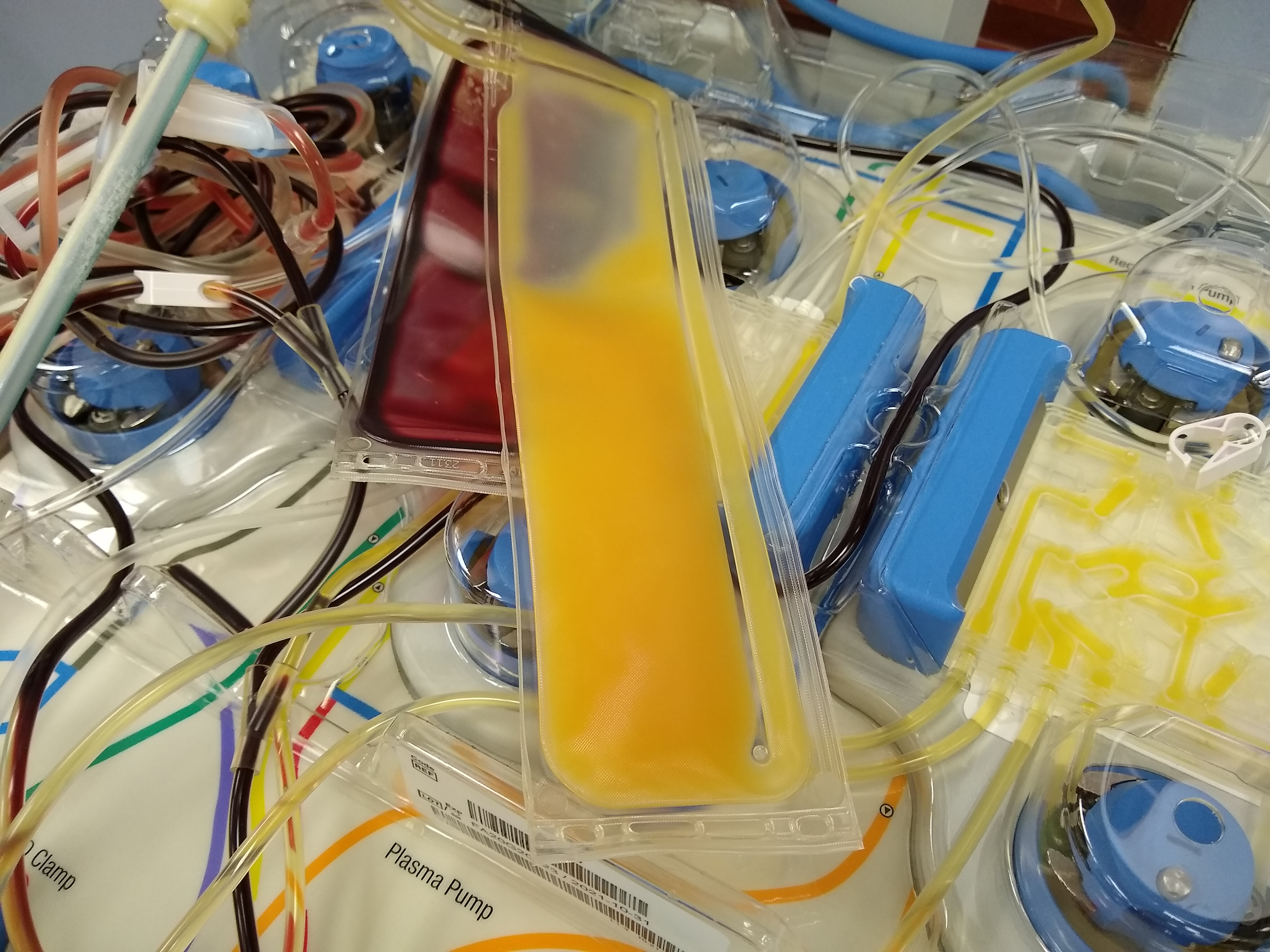
Platelets collected by using apheresis at an American Red Cross donation center

Apheresis is a blood donation method where the blood is passed through an apparatus that separates out one particular constituent and returns the remainder to the donor. Usually the component returned is the red blood cells, the portion of the blood that takes the longest to replace. Using this method an individual can donate plasma or platelets much more frequently than they can safely donate whole blood. These can be combined, with a donor giving both plasma and platelets in the same donation.

Platelets can also be separated from whole blood, but they must be pooled from multiple donations. From three to ten units of whole blood are required for a therapeutic dose. Plateletpheresis provides at least one full dose from each donation.

During a platelet donation, the blood is drawn from the patient and the platelets are separated from the other blood components. The remainder of the blood (red blood cells, plasma, and white blood cells) are returned to the patient. This process is completed several times for a period of up to two hours to collect a single donation.

Plasmapheresis is frequently used to collect source plasma that is used for manufacturing into medications much like the plasma from whole blood. Plasma collected at the same time as plateletpheresis is sometimes called concurrent plasma.

Erythrocytapheresis is used to collect more red blood cells than usual in a single donation, commonly known as "double reds" because two therapeutic units are collected each time. Leukapheresis collects specifically white blood cells.

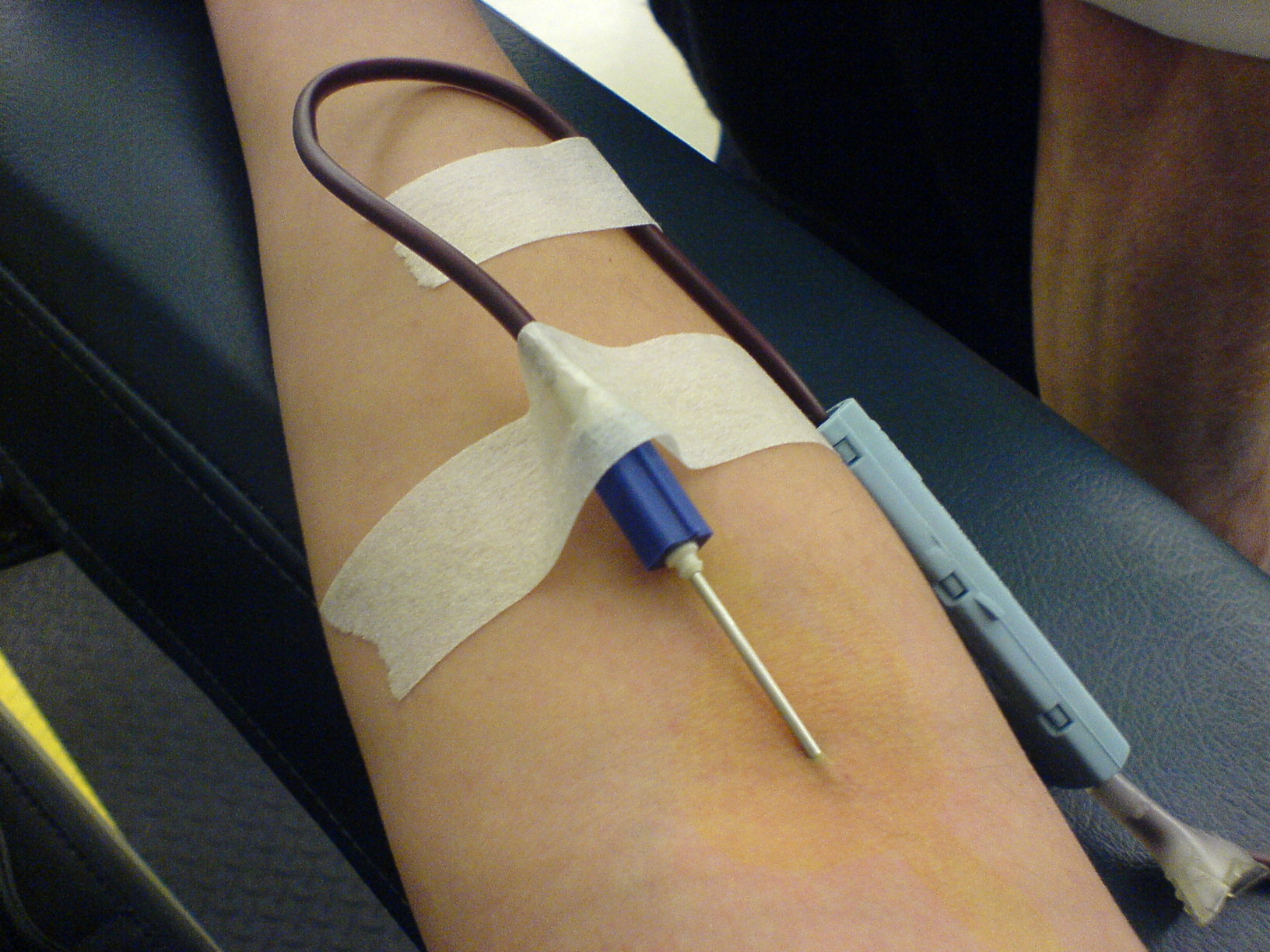
A relatively large needle is used for blood donations.

== Recovery and time between donations ==
Donors are usually kept at the donation site for 10–15 minutes after donating since most adverse reactions take place during or immediately after the donation. Blood centers typically provide light refreshments, such as orange juice and cookies, or a lunch allowance to help the donor recover. The needle site is covered with a bandage and the donor is directed to keep the bandage on for several hours. In hot climates, donors are advised to avoid dehydration (strenuous exercise and games, alcohol) until a few hours after donation.

Donated plasma is replaced after 2–3 days. Platelet count is reduced immediately after donation, but stays within the normal range throughout and recovers in days. Coagulation funciton is unaffected. Red blood cells are replaced by bone marrow into the circulatory system at a slower rate, on average 36 days in healthy adult males. In one study, the range was 20 to 59 days for recovery. These replacement rates are the basis of how frequently a donor can donate blood.

Plasmapheresis and plateletpheresis donors can donate much more frequently because they do not lose significant amounts of red cells. The exact rate of how often a donor can donate differs from country to country. For example, plasmapheresis donors in the United States are allowed to donate large volumes twice a week and could nominally donate 83 litres (about 22 gallons) in a year, whereas the same donor in Japan may only donate every other week and could only donate about 16 litres (about 4 gallons) in a year.

Iron supplementation decreases the rates of donor deferral due to low hemoglobin, both at the first donation visit and at subsequent donations. Iron-supplemented donors have higher hemoglobin and iron stores. On the other hand, iron supplementation frequently causes diarrhea, constipation and epigastric abdominal discomfort. The long-term effects of iron supplementation without measurement of iron stores are unknown.

== Complications ==
Donors are screened for health problems that would put them at risk for serious complications from donating. First-time donors, teenagers, and women are at a higher risk of a reaction. One study showed that 2% of donors had an adverse reaction to donation. Most of these reactions are minor. A study of 194,000 donations found only one donor with long-term complications. In the United States, a blood bank is required to report any death that might possibly be linked to a blood donation. An analysis of all reports from October 2008 to September 2009 evaluated six events and found that five of the deaths were clearly unrelated to donation, and in the remaining case they found no evidence that the donation was the cause of death.

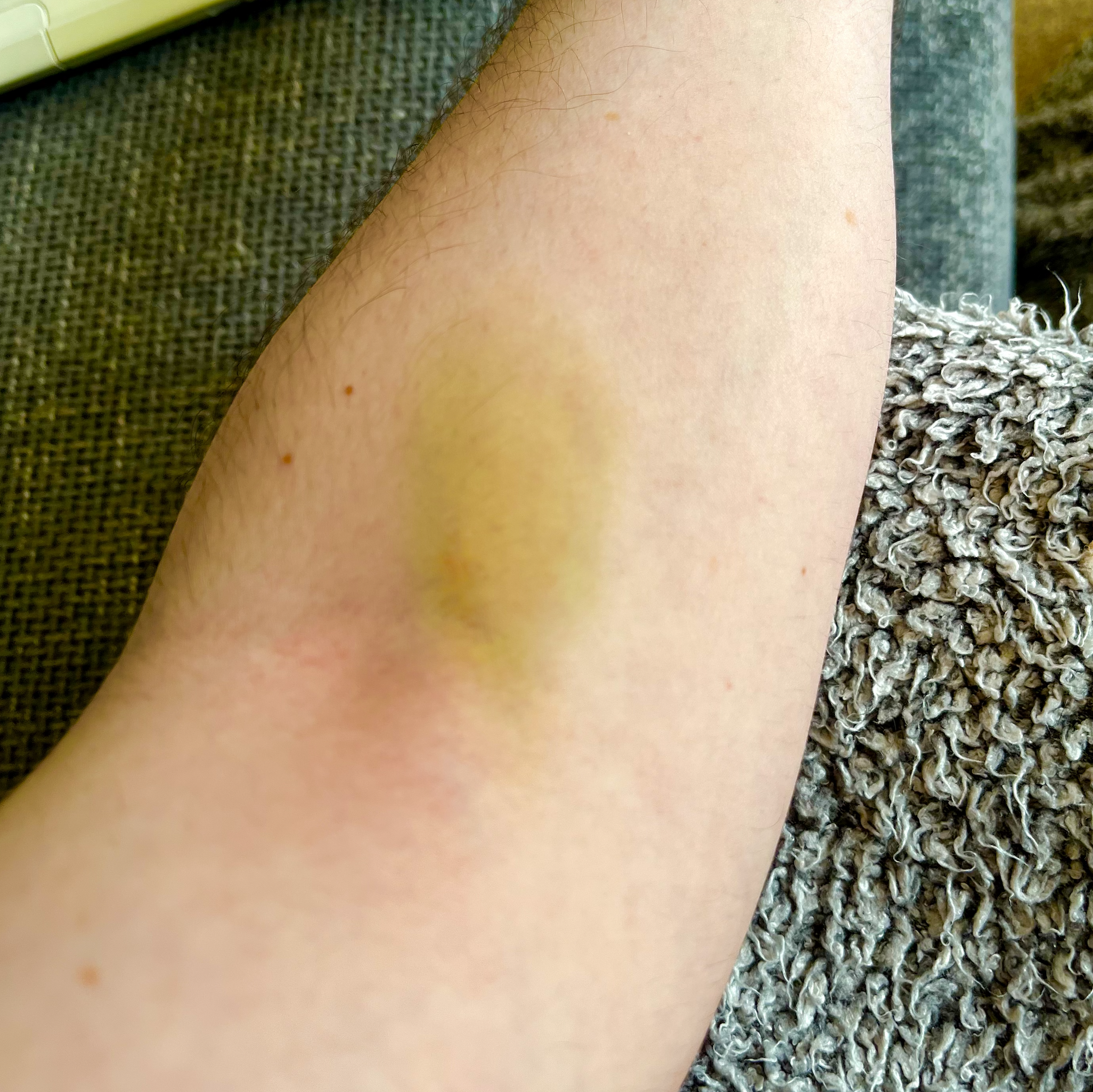
Bruising three days after donation

Hypovolemic reactions can occur because of a rapid change in blood pressure. Fainting is generally the worst problem encountered. Falls due to loss of consciousness may result in injuries in rare cases. The risk for developing dizziness with fainting is increased in female and young donors.

The process has similar risks to other forms of phlebotomy. Bruising of the arm from the needle insertion is the most common concern. One study found that fewer than 1% of donors had this problem. A number of less common complications of blood donation are known to occur. These include arterial puncture, delayed bleeding, nerve irritation, nerve injury, tendon injury, thrombophlebitis, and allergic reactions.

Donors sometimes have adverse reactions to the sodium citrate used in apheresis collection procedures to keep the blood from clotting. Since the anticoagulant is returned to the donor along with blood components that are not being collected, it can bind the calcium in the donor's blood and cause hypocalcemia. These reactions tend to cause tingling in the lips, but may cause convulsions, seizure, hypertension, or more serious problems. Donors are sometimes given calcium supplements during the donation to prevent these side effects.

In apheresis procedures, the red blood cells are returned. If this is done manually and the donor mistakenly receives the blood from a different donor, a transfusion reaction can take place. Manual apheresis is extremely rare in the developed world because of this risk and automated procedures are as safe as whole blood donations.

The final risk to blood donors is from equipment that has not been properly sterilized. In most cases, the equipment that comes in direct contact with blood is discarded after use. Re-used equipment was a significant problem in China in the 1990s, and up to 250,000 blood plasma donors may have been exposed to HIV from shared equipment.

== Storage, supply and demand ==
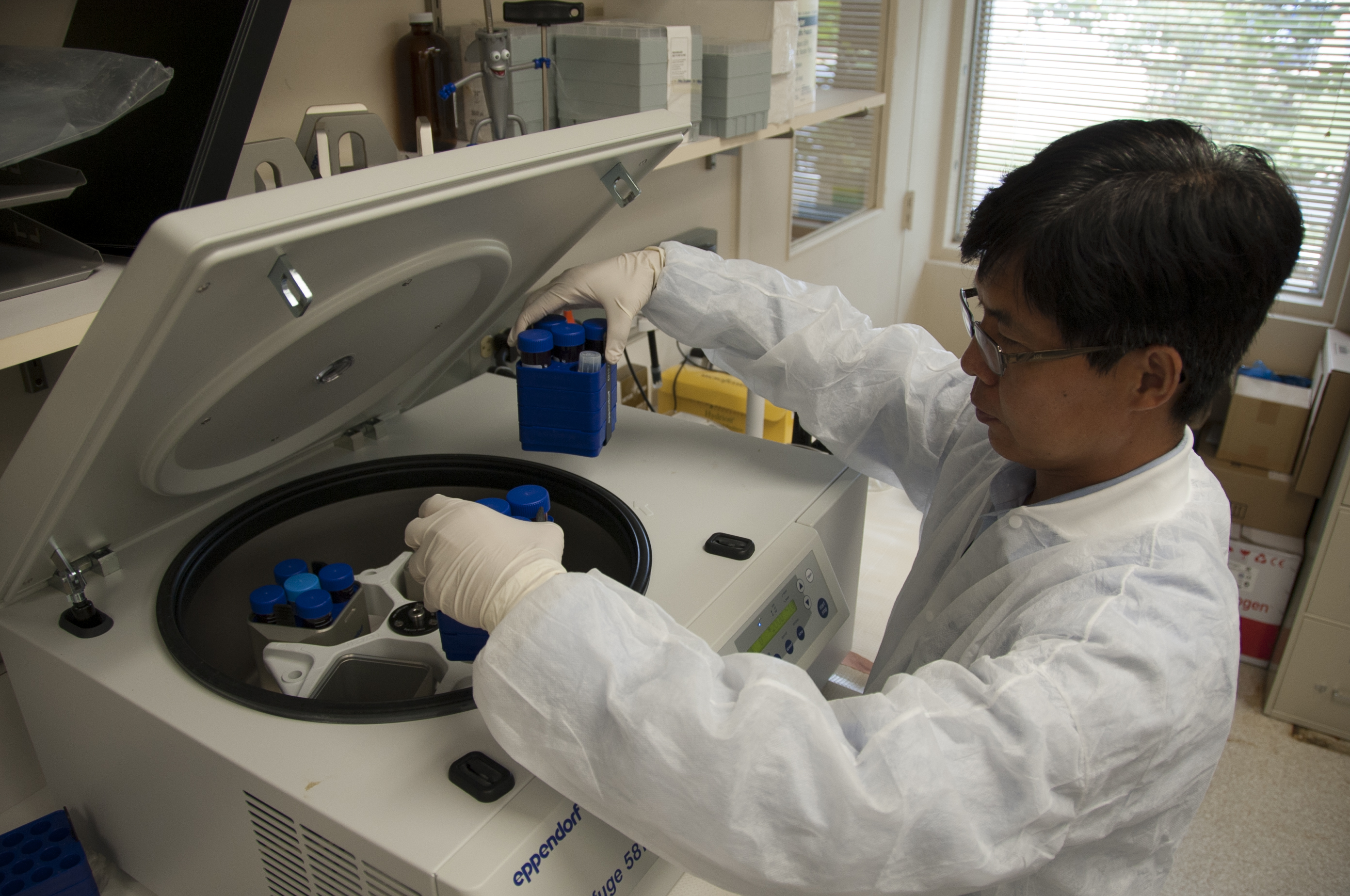
Whole blood is often separated, using a centrifuge, into components for storage and transportation.

=== Storage and blood shelf life ===
The collected blood is usually stored in a blood bank as separate components, and some of these have short shelf lives. There are no storage methods to keep platelets for extended periods of time, though some were being studied as of 2008. The longest shelf life used for platelets is seven days.

Red blood cells, the most frequently used component, have a shelf life of 35–42 days at refrigerated temperatures. For (relatively rare) long-term storage applications, this can be extended by freezing the blood with a mixture of glycerol, but this process is expensive and requires an extremely cold freezer for storage. Plasma can be stored frozen for an extended period of time and is typically given an expiration date of one year and maintaining a supply is less of a problem.

=== Demand for blood ===
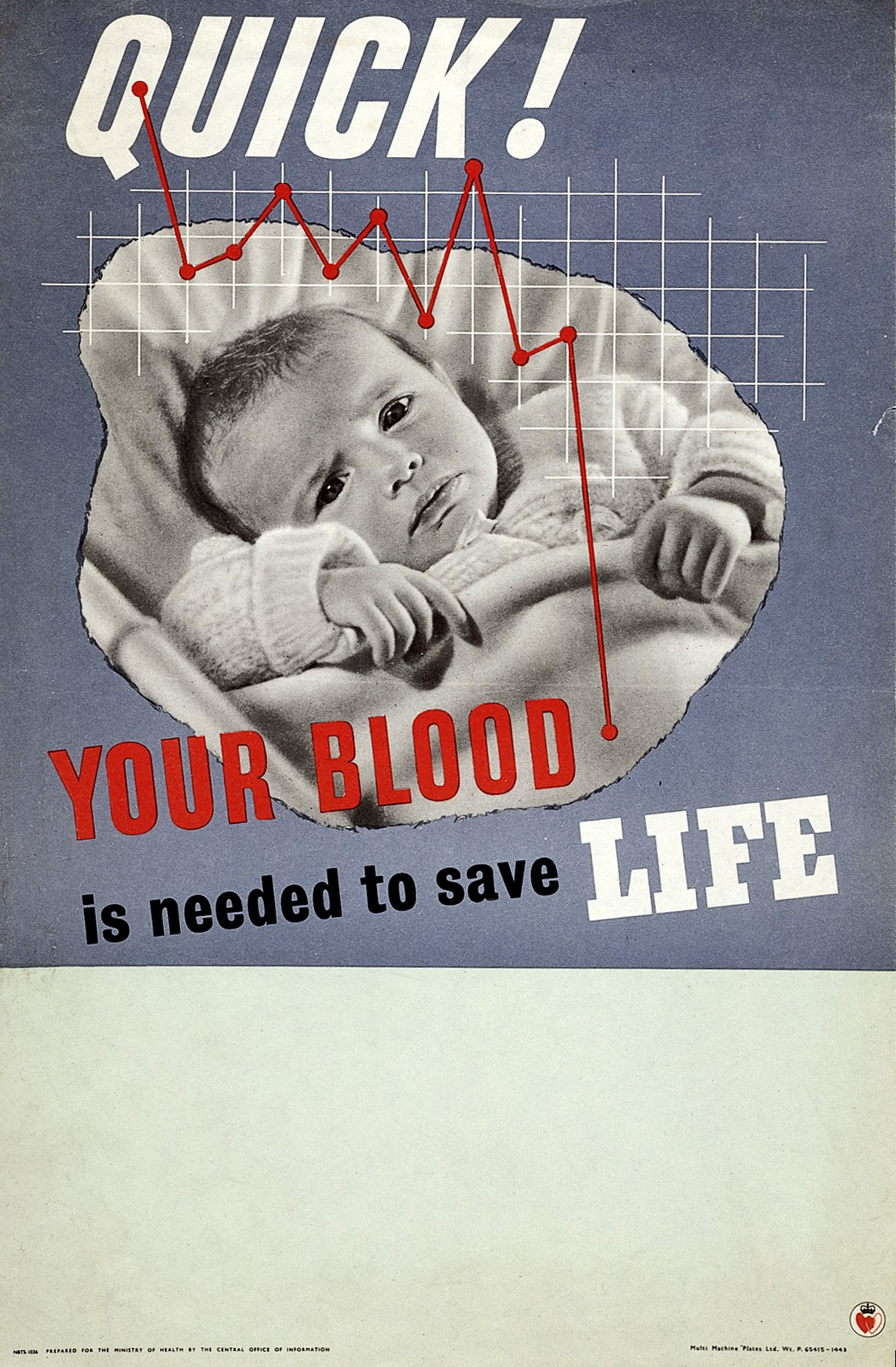
Blood donation poster from the United Kingdom

The American Red Cross states that in the United States, someone needs blood every two seconds, and someone needs platelets every thirty seconds. There is not a consistent demand for each blood type. One type of blood being in stock does not guarantee that another type is. Blood banks may have some units in stock but lack others, ultimately causing the patients that need units for specific blood types to have delayed or canceled procedures. Additionally, every year there is an increase of around 5-7% for transfusions without an increase of donors to balance it as well as a growing population of elderly people that will need more transfusions in the future without a predicted increase in donations to reflect those growing numbers. This was supported in 1998 where blood donations to the Red Cross increased to 8%, totaling 500,000 units but hospitals' need for donations increased by 11%.

Blood donations tend to always be high in demand with numerous accounts repeatedly stating periodic shortages over the decades. However, this trend is disrupted during national disasters. The trend demonstrates that people are donating the most during catastrophes when, arguably, donations are not as needed compared to periods without disasters. From 1988 to 2013, it has been reported that during every national disaster, there was a surplus of donations; a surplus that consisted of over 100 units. One of the most notable examples of this pattern was the September 11th attacks. A study observed that compared to the four weeks before September 11, there was an estimated increase of 18,700 donations from first-time donors for the first week after the attack: 4,000 was the average of donations from first-time donors before the attack which increased to about 22,700 donations; while repeat donors increased their donations by 10,000 per week: initially, donations were estimated to be around 16,400 which increased to 26,400 donations after September 11. Therefore, in the first week after the attack on 9/11, there was an overall estimated 28,700 increase in donations compared to the average weekly donations made four weeks prior to the attack. Increases in donations were observed in all blood donation centers, beginning on the day of the attack. While blood donations were above average after the first few weeks following 9/11, the number of donations fell from an estimated 49,000 donations in the first week to 26,000–28,000 donations between the second and fourth weeks after 9/11. Despite the substantial increase of donors, the rate that first-time donors would become repeat donors were the same before and after the attack.

The limited storage time means that it is difficult to have a stockpile of blood to prepare for a disaster. The subject was discussed at length after the September 11 attacks in the United States, and the consensus was that collecting during a disaster was impractical and that efforts should be focused on maintaining an adequate supply at all times. Blood centers in the U.S. often have difficulty maintaining even a three-day supply for routine transfusion demands.

=== Donation levels ===
Assistant Secretary for Health Brian Christine explaining how donating blood can save lives.

The World Health Organization (WHO) recognizes World Blood Donor Day on 14 June each year to promote blood donation. This is the birthday of Karl Landsteiner, the scientist who discovered the ABO blood group system. The theme of the 2012 World Blood Donor Day campaign, "Every blood donor is a hero" focuses on the idea that everyone can become a hero by giving blood. Based on data reported by 180 countries between 2011 and 2013, the WHO estimated that approximately 112.5 million units of blood were being collected annually.

In the United States it is estimated that 111 million citizens are eligible blood donors, or 37% of the population. However less than 10% of the 37% eligible blood donors donate annually. In the UK the NHS reports blood donation levels at "only 4%" while in Canada the rate is 3.5%.

== Donator's incentive and deterrence ==
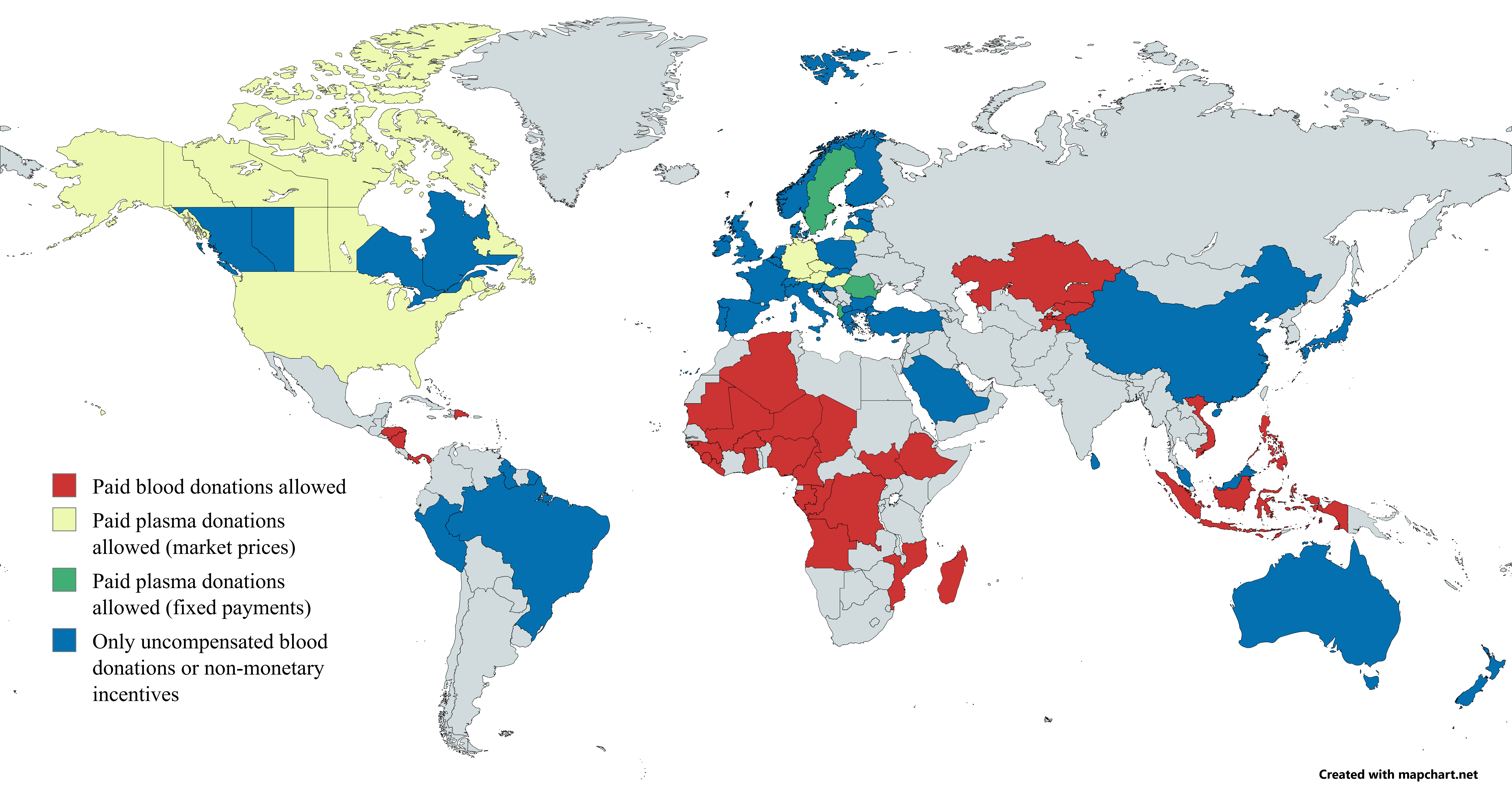
Countries allowing cash payments for blood and plasma donations

Multiple studies have shown that the main reason people donate is due to prosocial motivators (e.g., altruism, selflessness, charity), general awareness regarding the demand for blood, increased confidence in oneself, helping a personal friend/relative, and social pressure. On the other hand, lack of blood donations can occur due to fear, lack of faith in the medical professionals, inconvenience, and the lack of consideration for donating, or perceived racial discrimination. Pathologist Leo McCarthy states that blood shortages routinely occur in the United States between July 4 and Labor day and between Christmas and New Year.

=== Donor health benefits ===
In patients prone to iron overload, blood donation prevents the accumulation of toxic quantities. People with hemochromatosis need to regularly have excess iron removed, most commonly by bloodletting. Some countries have programs that allow them to receive the procedure at blood-donation centers, with the option to donate the blood removed.

Donating blood may reduce the risk of heart disease for men, but the link has not been firmly established and may be from selection bias because donors are screened for health problems.

Research published in 2012 demonstrated that in patients with metabolic syndrome, repeated blood donation is effective in reducing blood pressure, blood glucose, HbA1c, low-density lipoprotein/high-density lipoprotein ratio, and heart rate.

A study published in JAMA Network Open tracked PFAS levels in a clinical trial and showed that regular blood and plasma donations each resulted in a significant reduction in PFAS levels for the participants.

=== Donor compensation ===
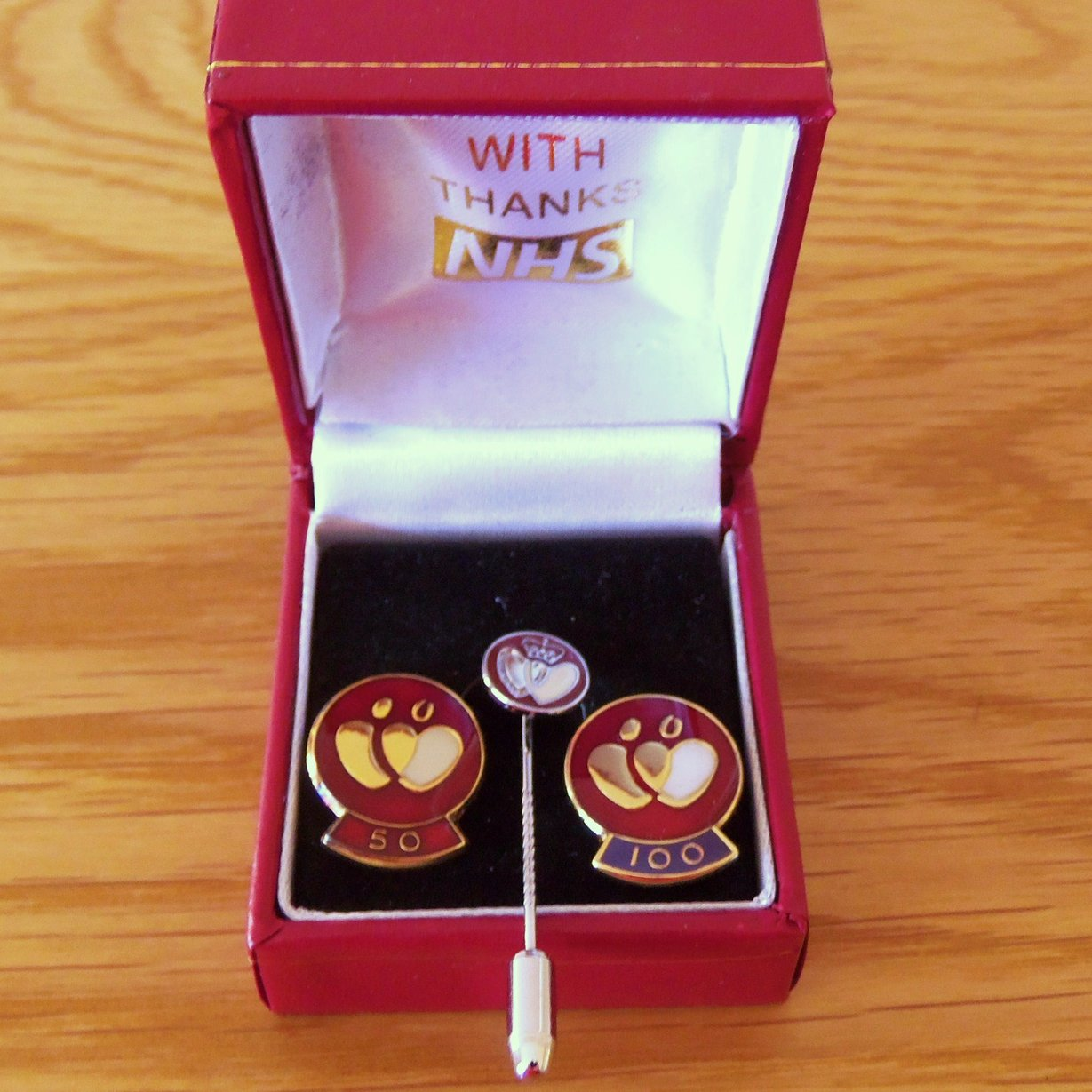
UK awards for 50, 25 and 100 donations

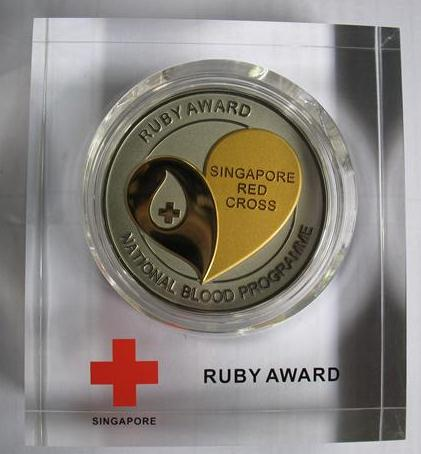
Ruby award from the Singapore Red Cross for 75 voluntary donations

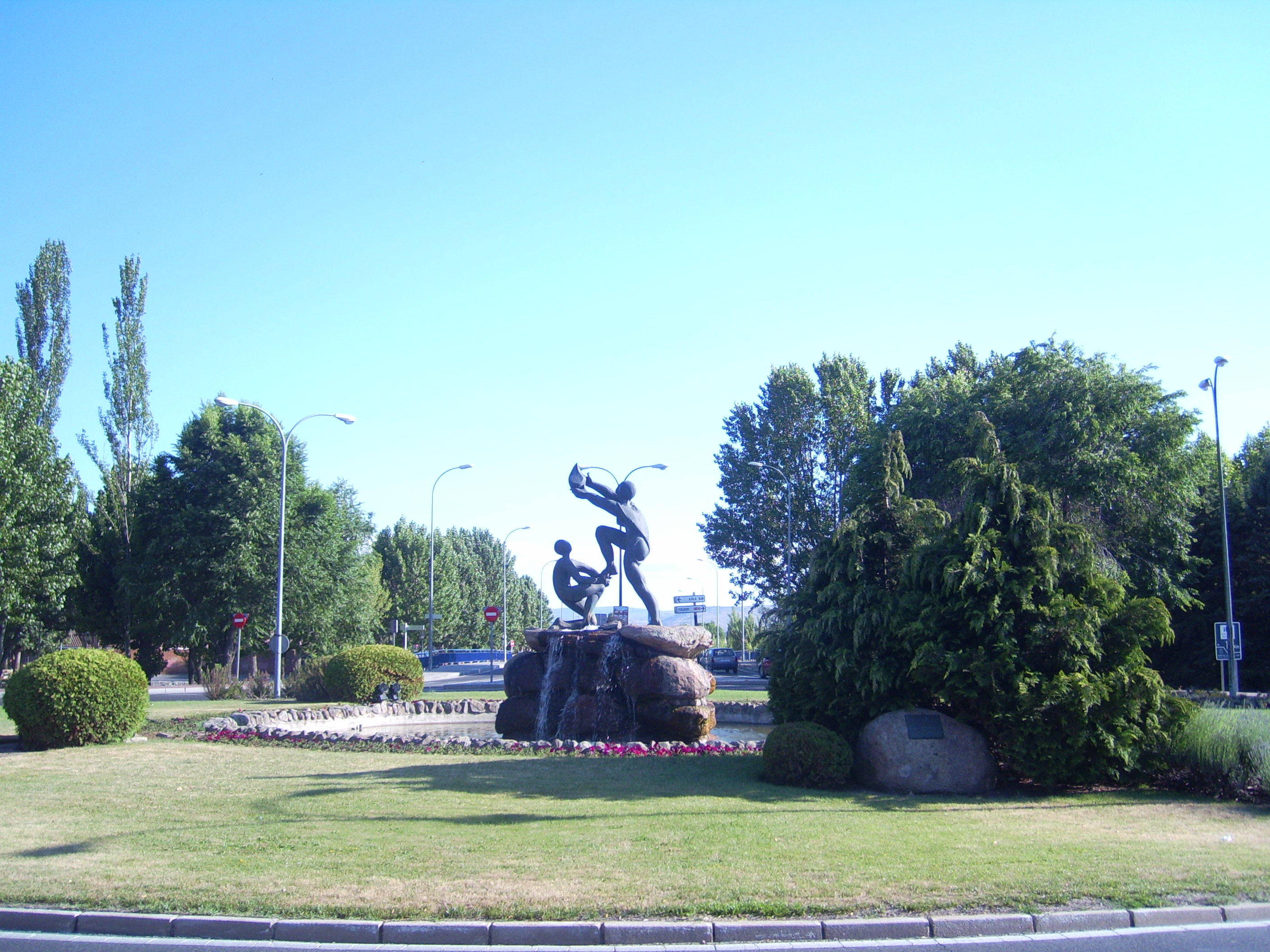
Monument to blood donors in Ávila, Spain

The World Health Organization set a goal in 1997 for all blood donations to come from unpaid volunteer donors, but as of 2006, only 49 of 124 countries surveyed had established this as a standard. Some countries, such as Tanzania, have made great strides in moving towards this standard, with 20 percent of donors in 2005 being unpaid volunteers and 80 percent in 2007, but 68 of 124 countries surveyed by WHO had made little or no progress. Most plasmapheresis donors in the United States are still paid for their donations. Donors are now paid between $25 and $50 per donation. In some countries, for example Brazil and the United Kingdom, it is illegal to receive any compensation, monetary or otherwise, for the donation of blood or other human tissues.

Regular donors are often given some sort of non-monetary recognition. Time off from work is a common benefit. For example, in Italy, blood donors receive the donation day as a paid holiday from work. In 2023, Poland introduced legislation that secured two days off work for employed persons when they donate — the donation day and the subsequent next day. Blood centers will also sometimes add incentives such as assurances that donors would have priority during shortages, free T-shirts, first aid kits, windshield scrapers, pens, and similar trinkets. There are also incentives for the people who recruit potential donors, such as prize drawings for donors and rewards for organizers of successful drives. Recognition of dedicated donors is common. For example, the Singapore Red Cross Society presents awards for voluntary donors who have made a certain number of donations under the Blood Donor Recruitment Programme starting with a "bronze award" for 25 donations. In Ireland, the Irish Blood Transfusion Service awards a silver pin or pendant for 10 donations, a gold pin or pendant for 20 donations, and a gold lapel pin for 50 donations. Donor who reach 100 donations are invited to a dinner ceremony where they receive a small porcelain statue depicting the logo of the IBTS (a pelican). The government of Malaysia also offers free outpatient and hospitalization benefits for blood donors, for example, 4 months of free outpatient treatment and hospitalization benefits after every donation. In Poland, after donating a specific amount of blood (18 litres for men and 15 for women), a person is gifted with the title of "Distinguished Honorary Blood Donor" as well as a medal. In addition, a popular privilege in larger Polish cities is the right to free use of public transport, but the conditions for obtaining a privilege may vary depending on the city. Also in Poland, Poznań's theatre Teatr Nowy offers theatregoers standing discounts on theatre tickets. During the COVID-19 pandemic, many US blood centers advertised free COVID-19 antibody testing as an incentive to donate; however, these antibody tests were also useful for blood centers in determining which donors could be flagged for convalescent plasma donations.

Most allogeneic blood donors donate as an act of charity and do not expect to receive any direct benefit from the donation. The sociologist Richard Titmuss, in his 1970 book The Gift Relationship: From Human Blood to Social Policy, compared the merits of the commercial and non-commercial blood donation systems of the US and the UK, coming down in favor of the latter. The book became a bestseller in the US, resulting in legislation to regulate the private market in blood. The book is still referenced in modern debates about turning blood into a commodity. The book was republished in 1997 and the same ideas and principles are applied to analogous donation programs, such as organ donation and sperm donation.

In low-resource countries, directed donation from family members and friends is common, because there is no other realistic option. The practice causes ethical challenges, because the donor may feel coerced or may be receiving undisclosed payments. Additionally, relying on a social network means that people with large networks of healthy adults have a better chance of receiving life-saving treatment than people without the same social privileges.

=== Postdonation refreshment ===
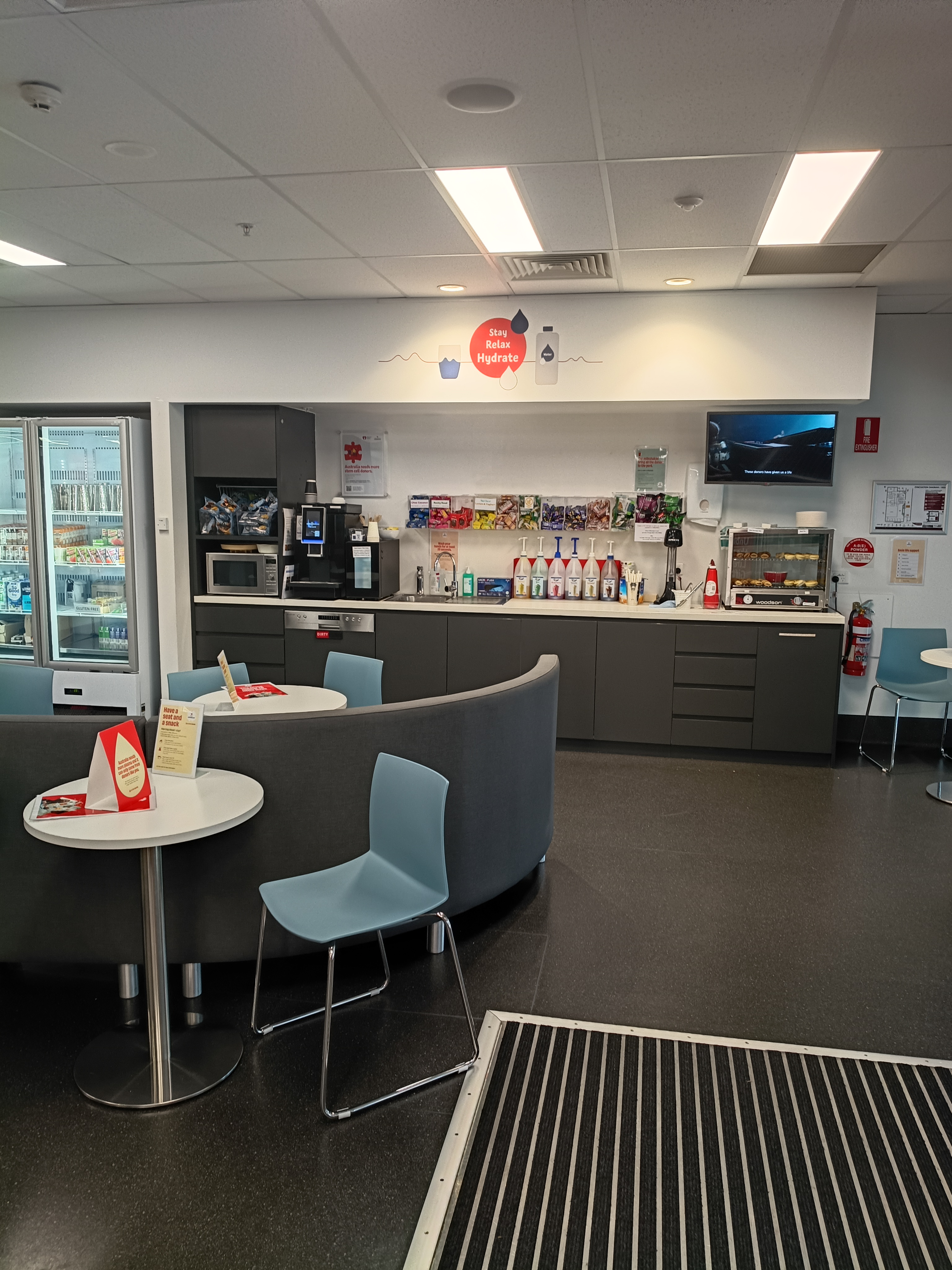
Refreshments and seating area at an Australian Red Cross Lifeblood donation centre in Newcastle, New South Wales, Australia.

In some countries, including Australia and the United Kingdom, donors, after a blood donation, are encouraged to rest briefly in the designated area of the donation centre where they are offered refreshments such as snacks and drinks to help support rehydration and recovery. This practice is associated with improved donor satisfaction and a reduced incidence of adverse donor events such as syncope.

== See also ==
- Blood bank#History (history of blood donation)
- Blood donation restrictions on men who have sex with men
- Blood substitute
- James Harrison (blood donor)
- List of blood donation agencies
- World Blood Donor Day
- Xenotransfusion
