= Richard Lewisohn =

German-American surgeon (1875–1961)

- Born: June 12, 1875; Hamburg, Germany
- Died: August 11, 1961 (aged 86); New York City
- Education: University of Freiburg
- Known for: Use of sodium citrate to prevent clotting in blood
- Scientific career
- Fields: Surgery
- Workplaces: Mount Sinai Hospital (Manhattan)

Richard Lewisohn (July 12, 1875 in Hamburg – August 11, 1961 in New York) was a German-American surgeon. At Mount Sinai Hospital in Manhattan, he developed procedures that made blood transfusion practical.

== Life and career ==
Lewisohn was born to German-Jewish parents in Hamburg and was educated at the local Gymnasium from where he entered medical school in Kiel in 1893. As was typical for German medical students, he attended several different medical schools, before receiving his doctorate from the University of Freiburg in 1899 with a thesis on malignant kidney tumors. He then served for two years as an assistant to Karl Weigert at the Senckenberg Institute in Frankfurt. In 1904 he became an assistant to Geheimrat Czerny in Heidelberg. In 1906 he emigrated to New York, where he became a gastroenterologist and surgeon; from 1928 to 1936 he was chief of the general surgical service at Mount Sinai.

== Scientific career ==
=== Blood transfusion ===
Following early speculation and its use in animal transfusion, in April 1914 Belgian physician Albert Hustin used sodium citrate to prevent donated blood from clotting during transfusion. Luis Agote had also used a citrate method at Buenos Aires on 14 November 1914. Working independently, Lewisohn's contribution, in 1915, was to determine the optimal concentration of sodium citrate for preserving blood products without inducing toxicity (0.2% for transfusions not exceeding 5g). Correct use of sodium citrate made it possible to preserve blood products for longer and longer periods of time allowing donor and donee to be geographically separate. His research was put into use during the First World War though it was only introduced to British medical services in 1917 (by Oswald Robertson).

=== Surgery ===
In 1922, he convinced his colleague Albert Berg to perform the first subtotal gastrectomy for peptic ulcer in the United States. He had traveled previously to Hans von Haberer in Innsbruck, Austria, where the method had already been applied and where he became familiar with the surgical techniques. Following the successful application at Mount Sinai, the technique spread to the rest of the United States for ulcers resistant to other treatment. Lewisohn was also a contemporary of Alexis Moschcowitz and his successor as chief of the general surgical service at Mount Sinai.

In 1937, Lewisohn retired from active surgery and became a consulting surgeon. He focused his time on cancer research, and was "the first to define the significance of folic acid in the biology of cancer" and was "among the first to use folic acid antagonists clinically". He spent approximately ten years thus engaged, before retiring more completely, only to re-enter the world of medical research in 1954, to oversee and the creation of a new cell research laboratory at Mount Sinai, made possible by a large donation.

=== Honours ===
In 1955 he received the American Association of Blood Banks' Karl Landsteiner Memorial Award. In January 1959 he became an honorary fellow of the Royal College of Surgeons of England, having been a fellow of the American College of Surgeons since 1916. Lewisohn was also a Fellow of the American Gastroenterological Association, and served on the American Board of Surgery.

== Personal life ==
In 1911, Lewisohn married Constance Strauss. They had three children, two of whom survived to adulthood.

== Selected works ==
- Lewisohn, Richard (1924). "The Citrate Method of Blood Transfusion after Ten Years; A Retrospect". The Boston Medical and Surgical Journal. 190 (18): 733–742. doi:10.1056/NEJM192405011901801. ISSN 0096-6762.
- Lewisohn, Richard (1952). "Blood transfusion by the citrate method". The American Journal of Medicine. 13 (5): 550–555. doi:10.1016/0002-9343(52)90019-3. ISSN 0002-9343. PMID 12996530. (Reprinted from the original 1915 article.)
