= Sodium citrate =

Sodium citrate may refer to any of the sodium salts of citric acid (though most commonly the third):

- Monosodium citrate
- Disodium citrate
- Trisodium citrate

The three forms of salt are collectively known by the E number E331.

== Applications ==
=== Food ===
Sodium citrates are used as acidity regulators in food and drinks, and also as emulsifiers for oils. They are generally considered safe and are designated GRAS by the FDA.

=== Blood clotting inhibitor ===
Sodium citrate is used to prevent donated blood from clotting in storage, and can also be used as an additive for apheresis to prevent clots forming in the tubes of the machine. By binding with calcium ions in the blood it prevents the process of coagulation. It is also used as an anticoagulant for laboratory testing, in that blood samples are collected into sodium citrate-containing tubes for tests such as the PT (INR), APTT, and fibrinogen levels. Sodium citrate is used in medical contexts as an alkalinizing agent in place of sodium bicarbonate, to neutralize excess acid in the blood and urine.

=== Metabolic acidosis ===
It has applications for the treatment of metabolic acidosis and chronic kidney disease.

=== Ferrous nanoparticles ===
Along with oleic acid, sodium citrate may be used in the synthesis of magnetic Fe_{3}O_{4} nanoparticle coatings.
