= Copper(II) citrate =

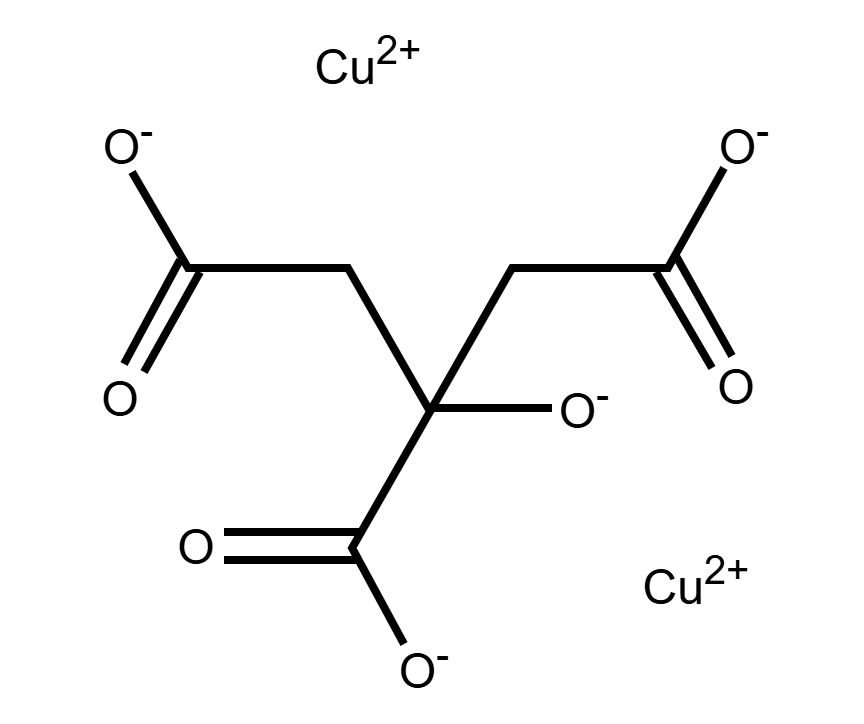
- Skeletal formula of the compound

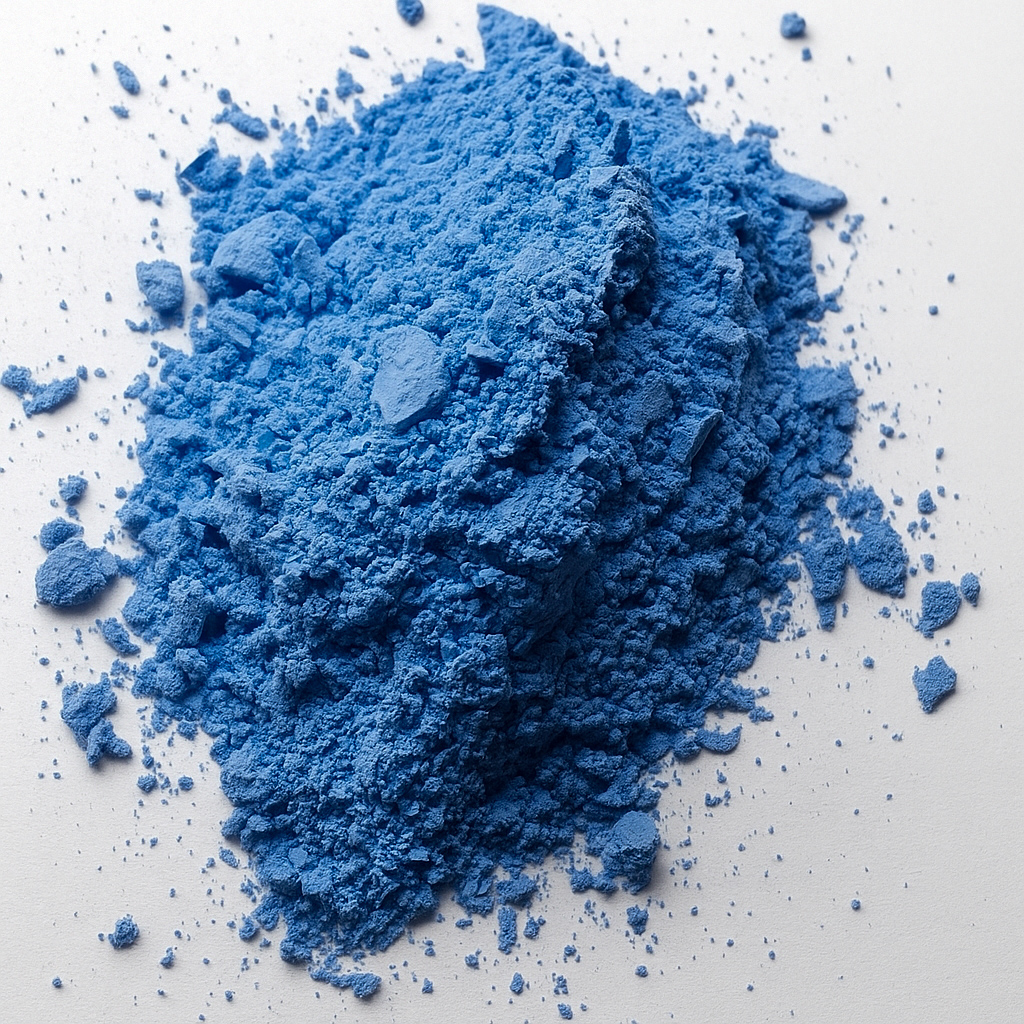
- Anhydrous copper(II) citrate

Names
- IUPAC name copper(II) 2-oxidopropane-1,2,3-tricarboxylate
- Other names cupric citrate; dicopper citrate

Identifiers
CAS Number	866-82-0; hemipentahydrate: 6020-30-0
3D model (JSmol)	Interactive image; hemipentahydrate: Interactive image
ChemSpider	21171752; hemipentahydrate: 32700143
ECHA InfoCard	100.169.194
EC Number	212-752-9
PubChem CID	14454876; hemipentahydrate: 71586843
UNII	F70D117TTU; hemipentahydrate: L40S1PLZ5W
CompTox Dashboard (EPA)	DTXSID00881033 DTXSID3047500, DTXSID00881033
- InChI: InChI=1S/C6H7O7.2Cu/c7-3(8)1-6(13,5(11)12)2-4(9)10;;/h1-2H2,(H,7,8)(H,9,10)(H,11,12);;/q-1;2*+2/p-3 Key: FWBOFUGDKHMVPI-UHFFFAOYSA-K; hemipentahydrate: InChI=1S/2C6H7O7.4Cu.5H2O/c2*7-3(8)1-6(13,5(11)12)2-4(9)10;;;;;;;;;/h2*1-2H2,(H,7,8)(H,9,10)(H,11,12);;;;;5*1H2/q2*-1;4*+2;;;;;/p-6 Key: NBHBWRHMKGDJMS-UHFFFAOYSA-H
- SMILES: C(C(=O)[O-])C(CC(=O)[O-])(C(=O)[O-])[O-].[Cu+2].[Cu+2]; hemipentahydrate: C(C(=O)[O-])C(CC(=O)[O-])(C(=O)[O-])[O-].C(C(=O)[O-])C(CC(=O)[O-])(C(=O)[O-])[O-].O.O.O.O.O.[Cu+2].[Cu+2].[Cu+2].[Cu+2]

Properties
Chemical formula	C_{6}H_{4}Cu_{2}O_{7} (anhydrous); C_{6}H_{4}Cu_{2}O_{7}·2.5H_{2}O (hemipentahydrate)
Molar mass	315.18 g·mol^{−1} (anhydrous); 360.22 g·mol^{−1} (2.5-hydrate)
Appearance	blue-green solid
Density	1.667 g·cm^{−3}
Solubility in water	slightly soluble in water; more soluble in dilute acids and in aqueous ammonia

Hazards
- GHS labelling
Pictograms	(GHS07: Exclamation mark) (GHS09: Environmental hazard)
Signal word	Warning
Hazard statements	H302, H410
Precautionary statements	P264, P270, P273, P301+P317, P330, P391, P501
- Except where otherwise noted, data are given for materials in their standard state (at 25 °C [77 °F], 100 kPa). Infobox references

Copper(II) citrate is the copper(II) salt of citric acid that occurs in several hydration states. Commercial material is commonly a blue-green solid and is used as a source of copper in industrial, agricultural and some supplement applications.

== Properties ==
The anhydrous powder is blue while the hydrate is a light green.

== Preparation ==
Copper(II) citrate can be prepared by reacting a soluble copper(II) salt such as copper(II) sulfate with trisodium citrate or tripotassium citrate; different hydrate stoichiometries may be isolated depending on conditions.

== Uses ==
Copper(II) citrate is used as a copper source in some agricultural micronutrient formulations and in proprietary supplement formulations. It is also used as a reagent and copper source in industrial and research contexts.
