= Monosodium citrate =

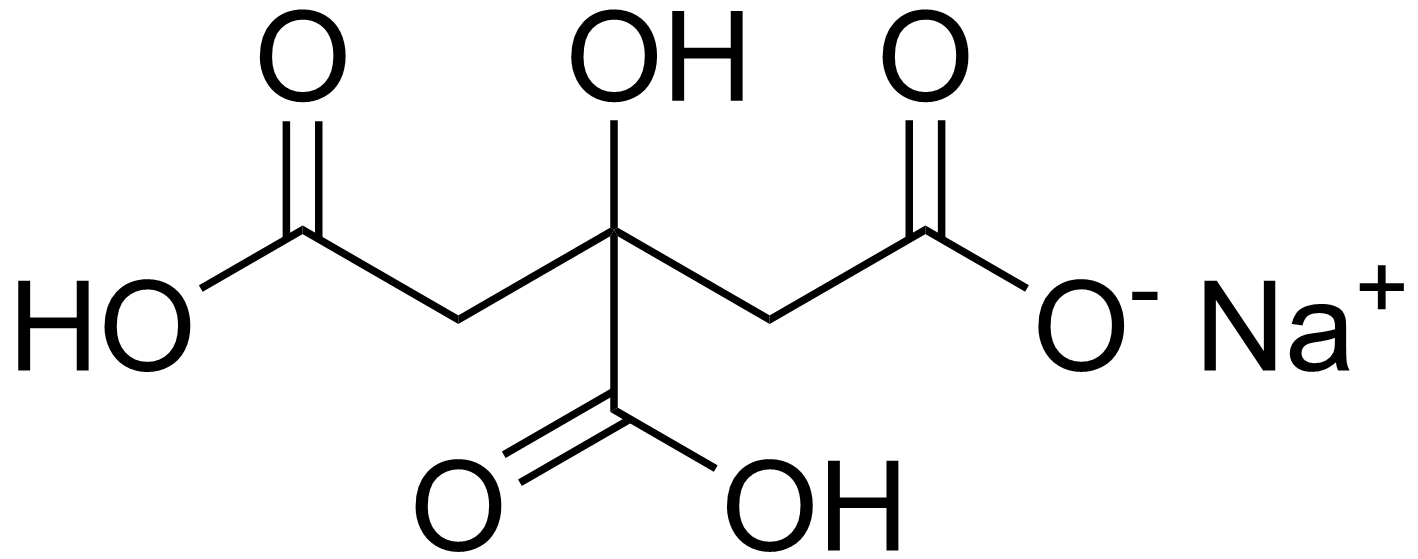

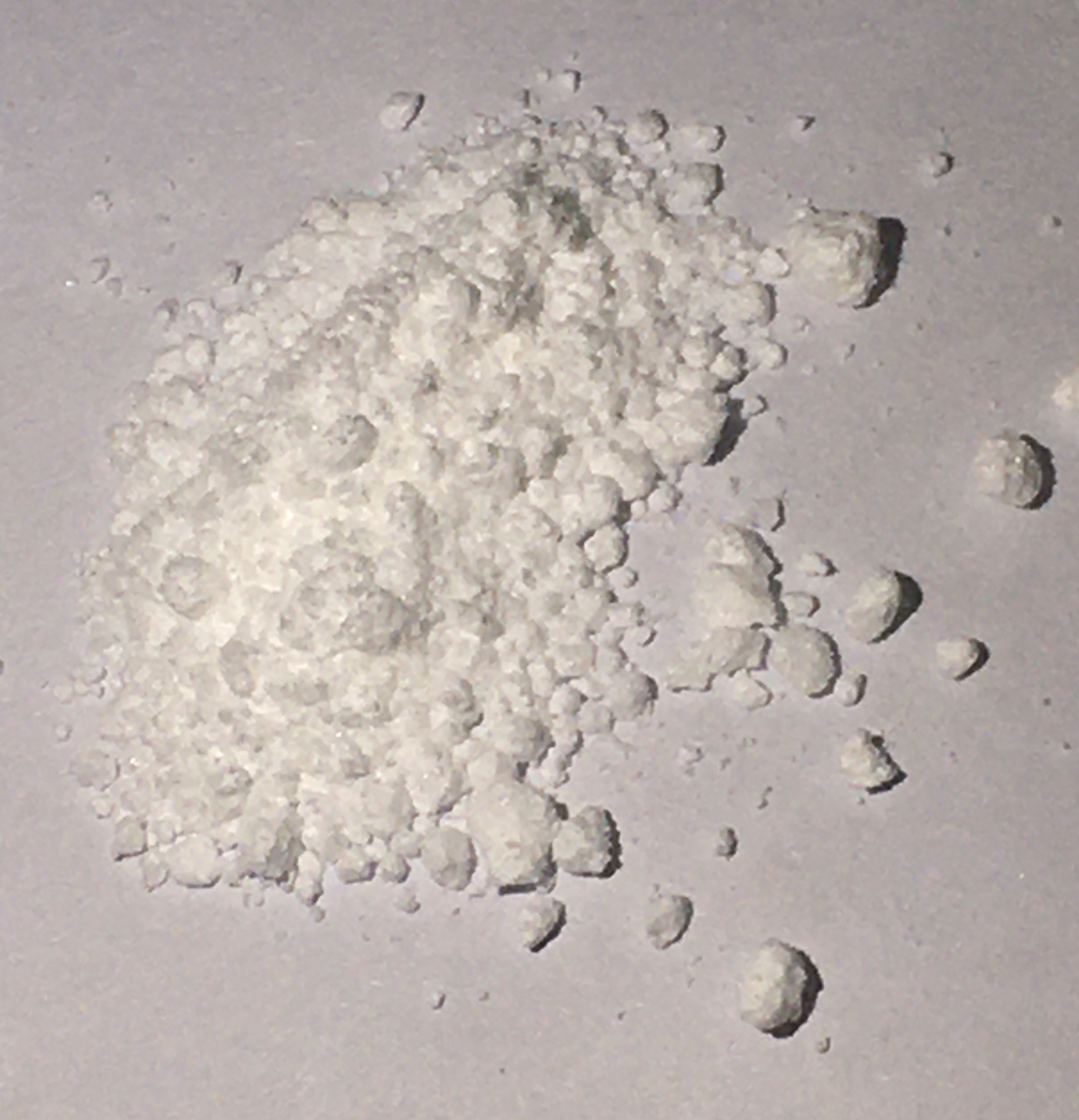

Names
- IUPAC name Sodium 2-(carboxymethyl)-2,4-dihydroxy-4-oxobutanoate
- Other names sodium dihydrogen 2-hydroxypropane-1,2,3-tricarboxylate

Identifiers
CAS Number	18996-35-5
3D model (JSmol)	Interactive image
ChEBI	CHEBI:53258
ChemSpider	27304
ECHA InfoCard	100.038.834
EC Number	242-734-6
E number	E331i (antioxidants, ...)
PubChem CID	23662352
RTECS number	GE9750000
UNII	68538UP9SE
CompTox Dashboard (EPA)	DTXSID80872904
- InChI: InChI=1S/C6H8O7.Na/c7-3(8)1-6(13,5(11)12)2-4(9)10;/h13H,1-2H2,(H,7,8)(H,9,10)(H,11,12);/q;+1/p-1 Key: HWPKGOGLCKPRLZ-UHFFFAOYSA-M; InChI=1/C6H8O7.3Na/c7-3(8)1-6(13,5(11)12)2-4(9)10;;;/h13H,1-2H2,(H,7,8)(H,9,10)(H,11,12);;;/q;3*+1/p-3 Key: HRXKRNGNAMMEHJ-DFZHHIFOAL
- SMILES: C(C(=O)O)C(CC(=O)O)(C(=O)[O-])O.[Na+]

Properties
Chemical formula	C_{6}H_{7}NaO_{7}
Molar mass	214.105 g·mol^{−1}
Appearance	white powder hygroscopic
Odor	odorless
Melting point	212 °C (414 °F; 485 K)
Boiling point	309.6 °C (589.3 °F; 582.8 K)
Solubility in water	soluble
Solubility	negligible in ethanol
Acidity (pK_{a})	3.50–3.80

Structure
Crystal structure	Monoclinic
Space group	P21/a (No. 4)
Formula units (Z)	4

Hazards
- Lethal dose or concentration (LD, LC)
LD_{50} (median dose)	5400 mg/kg (mouse, oral) >2000 mg/kg (rat, dermal)
Safety data sheet (SDS)	Carl Roth
- Except where otherwise noted, data are given for materials in their standard state (at 25 °C [77 °F], 100 kPa). verify (what is ?) Infobox references

Monosodium citrate, more correctly, sodium dihydrogen citrate (Latin: natrium citricum acidulatum), is an acid salt of citric acid. Disodium citrate and trisodium citrate are also known. It can be prepared by partial neutralisation of citric acid with an aqueous solution of sodium bicarbonate or carbonate. It has a slightly acidic taste.

NaHCO_{3} + C_{6}H_{8}O_{7} → NaC_{6}H_{7}O_{7} + CO_{2} + H_{2}O

Na_{2}CO_{3} + 2C_{6}H_{8}O_{7} → 2NaC_{6}H_{7}O_{7} + CO_{2} + H_{2}O

It is highly soluble in water and practically insoluble in ethanol. Monosodium citrate is used as an anticoagulant in blood samples. It is used as an alkalinizing agent to prevent kidney stone disease. The crystals form as nearly perfect cubes.
