= Luis Agote =

Argentine physician and researcher

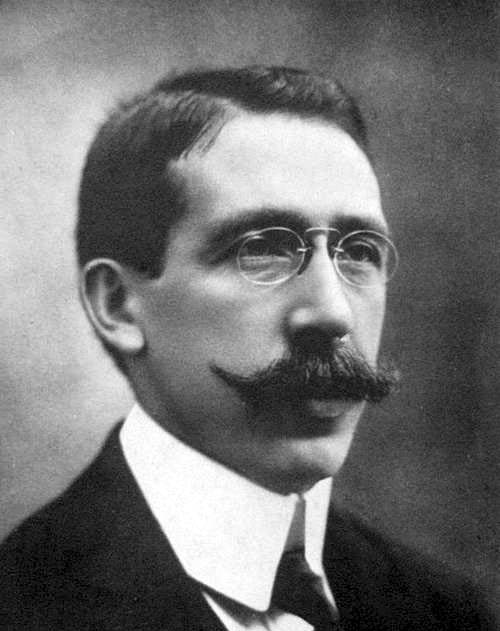
Dr. Luis Agote

Luis Agote (September 22, 1868 – November 12, 1954) was an Argentine physician and researcher. He was the first to perform a non-direct blood transfusion using sodium citrate as an anticoagulant. The procedure took place in Rawson hospital in the city of Buenos Aires on November 9, 1914. Agote was the first to perform this procedure in the Americas. Agote worked independently and separately from the Belgian surgeon Albert Hustin, who discovered that sodium citrate in tolerable quantities could anticoagulate blood for transfusion on March 27, 1914.

== Biography ==
Agote was the son of a politician. He studied first in the Colegio Nacional de Buenos Aires, and then at the University of Buenos Aires Faculty of Medicine, where he was also a teacher. He graduated as a doctor in 1893 with a thesis about suppurative hepatitis. He became Secretary of the National Department of Hygiene in 1894 and became head of the leper hospital in 1895 on the island of Martin Garcia. He was elected Congressman in 1910 and Senator in 1916 of the legislature in Argentina.

== First recorded transfusions ==
The first recorded blood transfusion was made between dogs by the English doctor Richard Lower around 1666. In 1667, French scientist Juan Bautista Denys transfused a human with animal blood. In 1900, Karl Landsteiner identified some of the blood substances responsible for the agglutination of red blood cells, identifying blood groups for the first time and some of their incompatibilities.

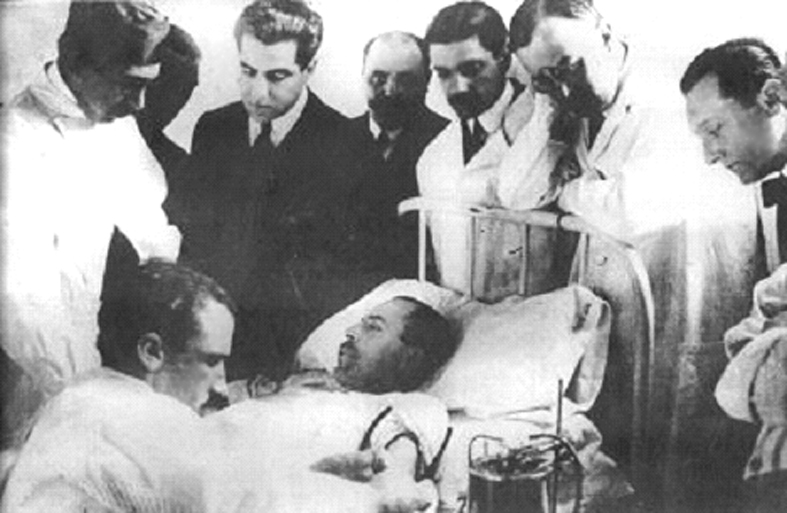
Dr. Luis Agote (2nd from right) overseeing one of the first safe and effective blood transfusion in 1914

Direct transfusions were still not practiced at the beginning of the 20th century because it was impossible to keep unaltered blood outside the body for later use. After 6–12 minutes, coagulation begins manifested initially by a gradual increase of viscosity that terminates with almost complete solidification. Coagulation is the defense of an organism to staunch wounds and minimize hemorrhages. Now we know that clotting is almost totally formed by platelets fastened by a network of filaments of fibrin.

Fibrin does not normally exist in blood and is created from protein plasma by the action of the thrombin enzyme. Similarly, thrombin is not naturally present in blood and is created by the precursor substabrin, in a process that involves platelets, some exiting from calcium and substances produced by lesioned materials. Since clots are not created if there is a lack of some of these elements, the addition of sodium citrate (which eliminates calcium ions from blood) prevents its formation.

== Agote's investigation ==
Concerned about the issue of bleeding in hemophilic patients, he tackled the problem of long-term blood preservation with laboratory technician Lucio Imaz. His first attempts involving special containers and maintaining the blood work at a constant temperature were unsuccessful. He sought out for a substance that would aggregate the blood and avoid coagulation. After many in vitro laboratory tests and trials with animals, Agote, without the knowledge of its biochemical origin or biological behavior, found that sodium citrate prevented the formation of clots. This substance was tolerated and expelled from the organism without causing any major problems. The first human trials were performed on November 9, 1914, in a classroom at the Instituto Modelo de Clínica Médica (Argentina), having as witnesses the Rector of the University of Buenos Aires, Eufemio Uballes, the dean of the Faculty of Medicine, Luis Güemes, the General Director of Public Assistance, Baldomero Sommer, and the municipal mayor, Enrique Palacio, in addition to many other professors and doctors.

== Acknowledgments ==
While living, the University of Buenos Aires recognized him as honorary professor and the National Academy of Medicine of Argentina named him as honorary member. Chile honored him in 1916 with the Order of Merit (Chile).
