= Alkalinizing agent =

Class of pharmaceutical drugs

- Specialty: Nephrology

Alkalinizing agents are drugs used to manage disorders associated with low pH. For example, they may be used to treat acidosis due to kidney failure.

Used for oral or parenteral therapy, sodium bicarbonate is the commonly preferred alkalinizing agent. Others include potassium citrate, calcium carbonate, sodium lactate and calcium acetate.
