= Albert Hustin =

Belgian medical doctor

Albert Hustin (1882–1967) was a Belgian medical doctor.

Hustin was born in Ethe and died in Uccle (Uccle Brussels – Belgium).

In 1914, he was the first person to successfully practice non-direct blood transfusions with sodium citrate used as an anticoagulant. The second one was the Argentinean researcher, Luis Agote. Like Agote, Hustin added sodium citrate to the blood to preserve it, and stop it from clotting.
