= Disodium citrate =

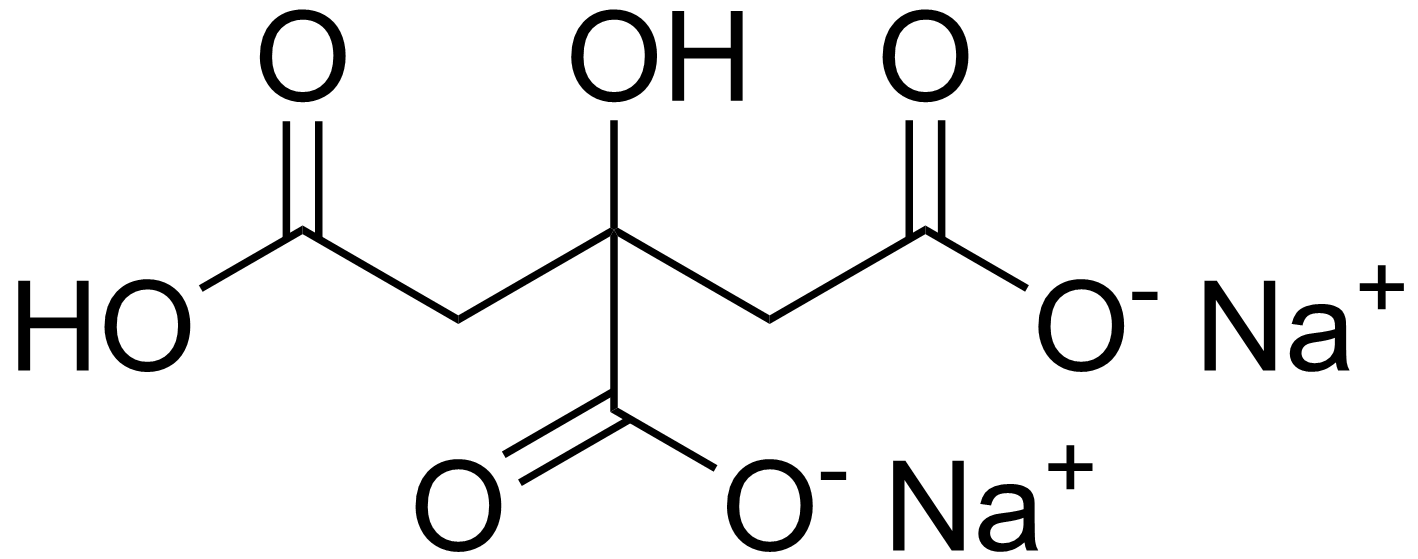

Names
- IUPAC name Disodium 3-carboxy-3-hydroxypentanedioate

Identifiers
CAS Number	144-33-2
3D model (JSmol)	Interactive image
ChemSpider	8606
ECHA InfoCard	100.005.113
EC Number	205-623-3
E number	E331ii (antioxidants, ...)
PubChem CID	8950
RTECS number	GE7580000
UNII	6FO62KCQ7A
CompTox Dashboard (EPA)	DTXSID50889423
- InChI: InChI=1S/C6H8O7.2Na/c7-3(8)1-6(13,5(11)12)2-4(9)10;;/h13H,1-2H2,(H,7,8)(H,9,10)(H,11,12);;/q;2*+1/p-2 Key: CEYULKASIQJZGP-UHFFFAOYSA-L
- SMILES: C(C(=O)[O-])C(CC(=O)[O-])(C(=O)O)O.[Na+].[Na+]

Properties
Chemical formula	C_{6}H_{6}Na_{2}O_{7}
Molar mass	236.087 g·mol^{−1}
Appearance	white crystalline powder
Melting point	149 °C (300 °F; 422 K)

Hazards
NFPA 704 (fire diamond)	0 1 0
- Except where otherwise noted, data are given for materials in their standard state (at 25 °C [77 °F], 100 kPa). verify (what is ?) Infobox references

Disodium citrate, also known as disodium hydrogen citrate, (Neo-Alkacitron) and sesquihydrate, is an acid salt of citric acid with the chemical formula Na_{2}C_{6}H_{6}O_{7}. It is used as an antioxidant in food and to improve the effects of other antioxidants. It is also used as an acidity regulator and sequestrant. Typical products include gelatin, jam, sweets, ice cream, carbonated beverages, milk powder, wine, and processed cheeses.

== Uses ==
=== Food ===
It is used as an antioxidant in food and to improve the effects of other antioxidants. It is also used as an acidity regulator and sequestrant. Typical products include gelatin, jam, sweets, ice cream, carbonated beverages, milk powder, wine, and processed cheeses. Disodium citrate can also be used as a thickening agent or stabilizer.

=== Manufacturing ===
Disodium citrate can also be used as an ingredient in household products that remove stains.

=== Health ===
Disodium citrate may be used in patients to alleviate discomfort from urinary-tract infections.
