= Christian J. Wiedermann =

Austrian physician and researcher

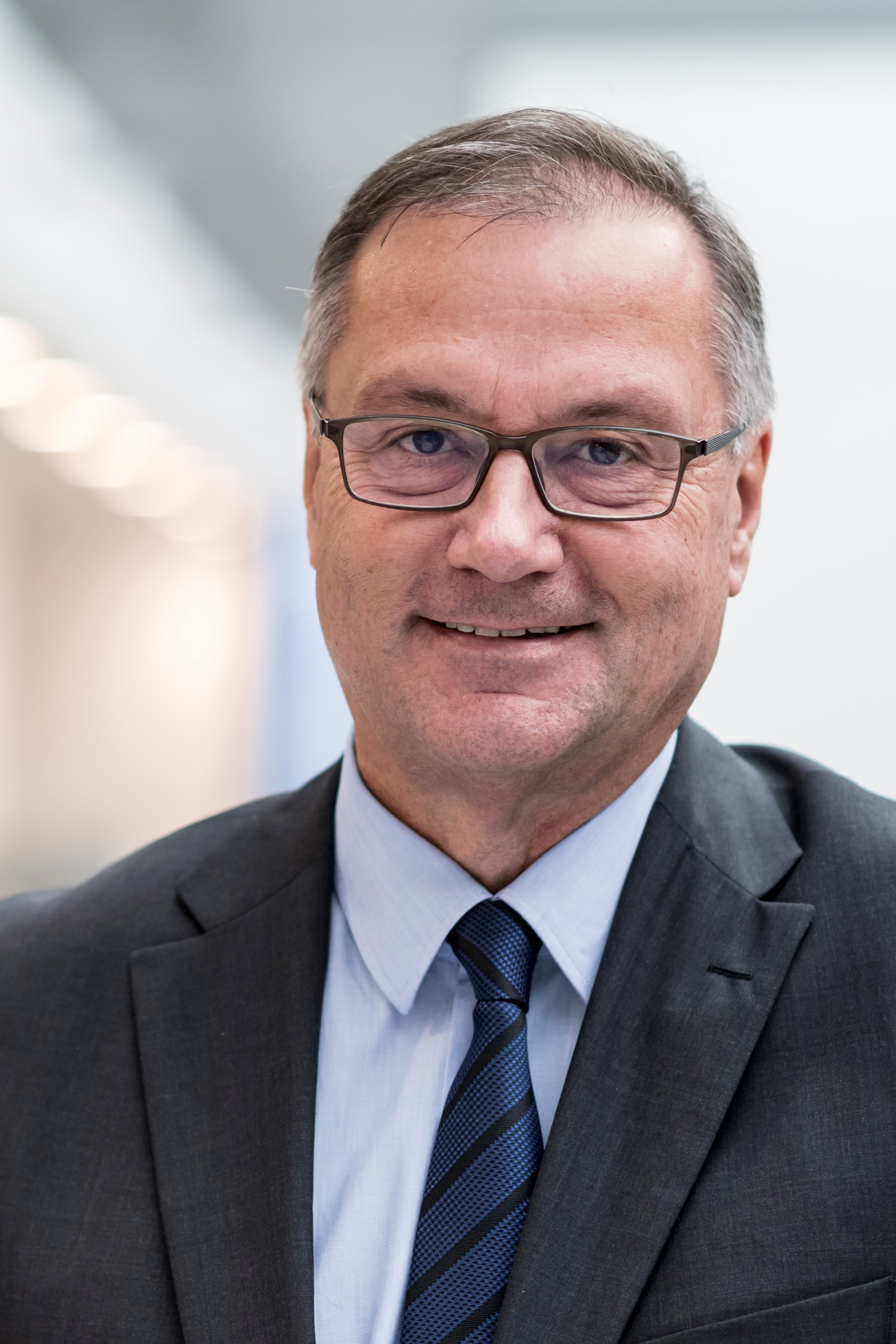
Christian Josef Wiedermann

Christian J. Wiedermann (born 1954 in Molzbichl, Austria) is an Austrian professor of medicine in internal medicine, clinical pharmacology, and intensive care. His research includes neuroimmunomodulation, interaction between inflammation and coagulation, fluid therapy in critical care, and ethical concerns in medical research.

== Early life and education ==
Wiedermann earned his medical degree from the University of Innsbruck, where he later specialized in internal medicine, clinical pharmacology, and intensive care medicine. He completed a Max Kade research fellowship at the National Institutes of Health in Bethesda, Maryland.

== Career ==
Wiedermann has held clinical and academic positions in Austria and Italy. He served as a senior physician at the University Clinic for Internal Medicine in Innsbruck, Austria, and later as head of the Department of Internal Medicine at the Central Hospital in Bolzano, Italy. He was medical director of Tirol Kliniken, the regional hospital network in Tyrol, and an associate researcher at the Institute for Public Health, Medical Decision Making, and Health Technology Assessment at the Private University for Health Sciences, Medical Informatics, and Technology in Tyrol, Austria.

He currently coordinates research projects at the Institute of General Practice and Public Health at the Claudiana College of Health Professions in Bolzano, Italy.

== Research and contributions ==
=== Inflammation and intensive care medicine ===
Wiedermann’s early research focused on the interplay between inflammation and neuropeptides, particularly in relation to the immune and nervous system interactions between psychological stress, immune responses, and inflammatory processes.

Building on this foundation, he later examined inflammatory and coagulation pathways in critically ill patients and explored their implications for intravenous fluid therapy. Wiedermann became a prominent critic of hydroxyethyl starch (HES), highlighting risks of organ damage. He also contributed to the evaluation of albumin in sepsis and septic shock. His systematic reviews on HES contributed to growing concerns over tissue storage and kidney injury, which influenced regulatory restrictions for its use in critically ill patients. He has also contributed to the evaluation of albumin in fluid management for patients with sepsis and septic shock, focusing on potential benefits related to endothelial function and oncotic pressure in hypoalbuminemic patients.

=== Bioethics and scientific misconduct ===
Wiedermann has published on ethical questions in clinical guideline development and on the influence of pharmaceutical industry sponsorship. His early work critically assessed the Surviving Sepsis Campaign, including financial conflicts of interest and their potential impact on treatment recommendations. This commentary anticipated and addressed the same issues later raised in a 2006 editorial in the New England Journal of Medicine.

Wiedermann contributed to public awareness of scientific misconduct involving German anesthesiologist Joachim Boldt. He highlighted the implications of fabricated research on HES, which influenced international guidelines for fluid resuscitation. In a 2018 article in Science, Wiedermann was cited for drawing attention to the risks posed by Boldt’s research. He also called for the retraction of Boldt's publications, including those in Critical Care Medicine, based on concerns raised by Justus Liebig University Giessen.

Retraction Watch published reports covering the Boldt case and broader concerns about scientific integrity. Wiedermann was acknowledged for drawing early attention to data fabrication and manipulated publications in critical care medicine. An editorial in the Journal of Cardiothoracic and Vascular Anesthesia credited him as one of the first to inform the journal’s editors about issues with Boldt’s work.
