= Fluid replacement =

Medical practice of replenishing bodily fluid

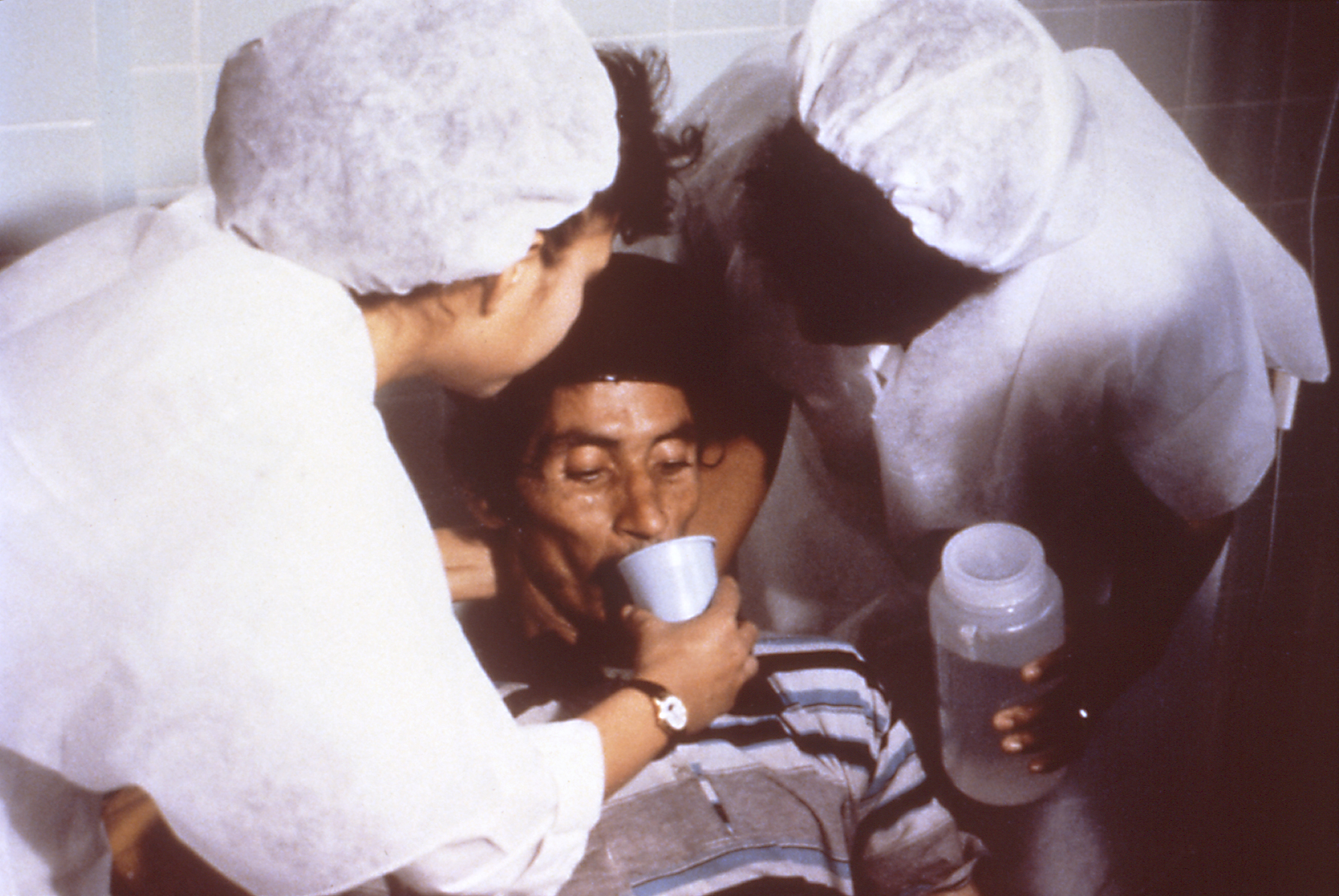
- A cholera patient drinking an oral rehydration solution (ORS)
- Other names: Fluid resuscitation

Fluid replacement or fluid resuscitation is the medical practice of replenishing bodily fluid lost through sweating, bleeding, fluid shifts or other pathologic processes. Fluids can be replaced with oral rehydration therapy (drinking), intravenous therapy, rectally such as with a Murphy drip, or by hypodermoclysis, the direct injection of fluid into the subcutaneous tissue. Fluids administered by the oral and hypodermic routes are absorbed more slowly than those given intravenously.

== By mouth ==
Children who receive ors

Oral rehydration therapy (ORT) is a simple treatment for dehydration associated with diarrhea, particularly gastroenteritis/gastroenteropathy, such as that caused by cholera or rotavirus. ORT consists of a solution of salts and sugars which is taken by mouth. For most mild to moderate dehydration in children, the preferable treatment in an emergency department is ORT over intravenous replacement of fluid.

It is used around the world, but is most important in the developing world, where it saves millions of children a year from death due to diarrhea—the second leading cause of death in children under five.

== Intravenous ==
Daily requirements
Water	30 ml/kg/24 h
Na^{+}	~ 1 mmol/kg/24 h
K^{+}	~ 1 mmol/kg/24 h
Glucose	5 (3 to 8) g/hour

Similar precaution should be taken in administration of resuscitation fluid as to drug prescription. Fluid replacement should be considered as part of the complex physiological in the human body. Therefore, fluid requirements should be adjusted from time to time in those who are severely ill.

In severe dehydration, intravenous fluid replacement is preferred, and may be lifesaving. It is especially useful where there is depletion of fluid both in the intracellular space and the vascular spaces.

Fluid replacement is also indicated in fluid depletion due to hemorrhage, extensive burns and excessive sweating (as from a prolonged fever), and prolonged diarrhea (cholera).

During surgical procedures, fluid requirement increases by increased evaporation, fluid shifts, or excessive urine production, among other possible causes. Even a small surgery may cause a loss of approximately 4 ml/kg/hour, and a large surgery approximately 8 ml/kg/hour, in addition to the basal fluid requirement.

The table to the right shows daily requirements for some major fluid components. If these cannot be given enterally, they may need to be given entirely intravenously. If continued long-term (more than approx. 2 days), a more complete regimen of total parenteral nutrition may be required.

=== Types ===
Resuscitation fluid can be broadly classified into: albumin solution, semisynthetic colloids, and crystalloids.

The types of intravenous fluids used in fluid replacement are generally within the class of volume expanders. Physiologic saline solution, or 0.9% sodium chloride solution, is often used because it is isotonic, and therefore will not cause potentially dangerous fluid shifts. Also, if it is anticipated that blood will be given, normal saline is used because it is the only fluid compatible with blood administration.

Blood transfusion is the only approved fluid replacement capable of carrying oxygen; some oxygen-carrying blood substitutes are under development.

Lactated Ringer's solution is another isotonic crystalloid solution and it is designed to match most closely blood plasma. If given intravenously, isotonic crystalloid fluids will be distributed to the intravascular and interstitial spaces.

Plasmalyte is another isotonic crystalloid.

Blood products, non-blood products and combinations are used in fluid replacement, including colloid and crystalloid solutions. Colloids are increasingly used but they are more expensive than crystalloids. A systematic review found no evidence that resuscitation with colloids, instead of crystalloids, reduces the risk of death in patients with trauma or burns, or following surgery.

=== Maintenance ===
Maintenance fluids are used in those who are currently normally hydrated but unable to drink enough to maintain this hydration. In children isotonic fluids are generally recommended for maintaining hydration. Potassium chloride and dextrose should be included. The amount of maintenance IV fluid required in 24 hours is based on the weight of the patient using the Holliday-Segar formula. For weights ranging from 0 to 10 kg, the caloric expenditure is 100 cal/kg/day; from 10 to 20 kg the caloric expenditure is 1000 cal plus 50 cal/kg for each kilogram of body weight more than 10; over 20 kg the caloric expenditure is 1500 cal plus 20 cal/kg for each kilogram more than 20. More complex calculations (e.g., those using body surface area) are rarely required.

=== Procedure ===
It is important to achieve a fluid status that is good enough to avoid low urine production. Low urine output has various limits, and varies for children, infants, and adults (see low urine production). The Parkland formula is not perfect and fluid therapy will need to be titrated to hemodynamic values and urine output.

The speed of fluid replacement may differ between procedures. For example, the planning of fluid replacement for burn patients is based on the Parkland formula (4mL Lactated Ringers X weight in kg X % total body surface area burned = Amount of fluid ( in ml) to give over 24 hours). The Parkland formula gives the minimum amount to be given in 24 hours. Half of the volume is given over the first eight hours after the time of the burn (not from time of admission to hospital) and the other half over the next 16 hours. In dehydration, 2/3 of the deficit may be given in 4 hours, and the rest during approximately 20 hours.

== Clinical uses ==
=== Septic shock ===
Fluid replacement in patients with septic shock can be divided into four stages as shown below:

- Resuscitation phase - The goal of this phase is to correct the hypotension. Intravenous crystalloid is the first choice of therapy. Surviving Sepsis Campaign recommends 30 ml/kg fluid resuscitation in this phase. Earlier fluid resuscitation is associated with improved survival. Mean arterial pressure should be targeted at more than 65 mmHg. Meanwhile, for early goal directed therapy (EGDT), fluids should be administered within the first six hours of septic shock until central venous pressure (CVP) reaches between 8 and 12 mmHg, with improvement of blood lactate levels, central venous oxygen saturation > 70%, and urine output ≥ 0.5 ml/kg/hour. Higher mean arterial pressures can be used in patients with chronic hypertension in order to reduce the usage of renal replacement therapy. However, if fluid replacement is inadequate in raising blood pressure, then vasopressor have to be used. However, there is no definite timing of starting vasopressors. Initiation of vasopressors within the first hour of sepsis can lead to poor organ perfusion and poor organ function. Late initiation of vasopressor can lead to organ damage and increase the risk of death. Frequent monitoring of fluid status of the patient is required to prevent fluid overload.
- Optimisation phase - In this phase, the goal is to increase the oxygen delivery to tissues in order to meet the oxygen demands of the tissues. Oxygen delivery can be improved by increasing stroke volume of the heart (through fluid challenge), haemoglobin concentration (through blood transfusion), and arterial oxygen saturation (through oxygen therapy). Fluid challenge is the procedure of giving large amounts of fluid in a short period of time. However, 50% of patients do not respond to fluid challenge. Additional fluid challenges only causes fluid overload. However, there is no gold standard on determining the fluid responsiveness. Among other ways of determining the fluid responsiveness and the end point of fluid resuscitation are: Central venous oxygen saturation (ScvO2), passive leg raising test, ultrasound measurements of pulse pressure variation, stroke volume variation, and respiratory variations at superior vena cava, inferior vena cava and internal jugular vein.
- Stabilisation phase - In this stage, the tissue perfusion starts to stabilise and the need of fluid or vasopressors starts reducing. Additional fluid challenges can be given only for those who are responsive. Maintenance fluid can be stopped if the perfusion status is adequate.
- Evacuation phase - In this phase, the goal is to remove excessive fluids from those who achieved adequate tissue perfusion. Negative fluid balance is associated with decreased risk of death. However, there is no consensus regarding the optimal timing for the fluid removal and risk of reduced perfusion following fluid removal is also inconclusive. A reasonable approach is to begin fluid restriction when the tissue perfusion is adequate, and consider diuretic treatment for those with clinical evidence of fluid overload and positive fluid balance. According to Fluid and Catheter Treatment Trial (FACTT Trial) protocol, those with mean arterial pressure of more than 60 mmHg, vasopressor free for more than 12 hours, with adequate urine output can be given furosemide to target central venous pressure less than 4 mmHg and pulmonary artery occlusion pressure (PAOP) of less than 8 mmHg. The levels of Brain natriuretic peptide can also be used to guide fluid removal.

=== Acute kidney injury ===
Sepsis accounts for 50% of acute kidney injury patients in (intensive care unit) (ICU). Intravenous crystalloid is recommended as the first line therapy to prevent or to treat acute kidney injury (AKI) when compared to colloids as colloids increases the risk of AKI. 4% human albumin may be used in cirrhotic patients with spontaneous bacterial peritonitis as it can reduce the rate of kidney failure and improve survival. However, fluid overload can exacerbate acute kidney injury. The use of diuretics does not prevent or treat AKI even with the help of renal replacement therapy. The 2012 KDIGO (Kidney Disease: Improving Global Outcomes) guidelines stated that diuretics should not be used to treat AKI, except for the management of volume overload. In acute respiratory distress syndrome (ARDS), conservative fluid management is associated with better oxygenation and lung function with less prevalence of dialysis in the first 60 days of hospitalization when compared with liberal fluid management.

=== Surgery (perioperative fluid therapy) ===
Managing fluids during major surgical procedures is an important aspect of surgical care. The goal of fluid therapy is to maintain fluid and electrolyte levels and restore levels that may be depleted. Intravenous fluid therapy is used when a person cannot control their own fluid intake and it can also reduce nausea and vomiting. Goal-directed fluid therapy is a perioperative strategy in which the person is administered fluids continuously and the amount of fluids given are based on the person's physiological and haemodynamic (blood flow) measurements. A second approach to fluid management during surgical procedures is called perioperative restrictive fluid therapy, also known as near-zero or zero-balance perioperative fluid approach; this approach recommends lower amounts of fluids during surgery, replacing fluids when the person is low (basal fluid requirements) or loses fluid due to a surgical procedure or bleed. The effectiveness of goal-directed fluid therapy compared to restrictive fluid therapy is not clear as evidence comparing both approaches have very low certainty.

== Fluid overload ==
Fluid overload is defined as an increase in body weight of over 10%. Aggressive fluid resuscitation can lead to fluid overload which can lead to damage of multiple organs: cerebral oedema, which leads to delirium; pulmonary oedema and pleural effusion, which lead to respiratory distress; myocardial oedema and pericardial effusion, which lead to impaired contractility of the heart; gastrointestinal oedema, which leads to malabsorption; hepatic congestion, which leads to cholestasis and acute kidney injury; and tissue oedema, which leads to poor wound healing. All these effects can cause disability and death, and increase in hospitalisation costs.

Fluid overload causes cardiac dilation, which leads to increased ventricular wall stress, mitral insufficiency and leads to cardiac dysfunction. Pulmonary hypertension can lead to tricuspid insufficiency. Excess administration of fluid causes accumulation of extracellular fluid, leading to pulmonary oedema and lack of oxygen delivery to tissues. The use of mechanical ventilation in such case can cause barotrauma, infection, and oxygen toxicity, leading to acute respiratory distress syndrome. Fluid overload also stretches the arterial endothelium, which causes damage to the glycocalyx, leading to capillary leakage and worsens the acute kidney injury.

== Other treatments ==
Proctoclysis, an enema, is the administration of fluid into the rectum as a hydration therapy. It is sometimes used for very ill persons with cancer. The Murphy drip is a device by means of which this treatment may be performed.

== See also ==
- Hypodermoclysis
- Intravenous therapy
- Hypovolemia
- Third spacing
- Pentastarch
- Passive leg raising test
