= Fluid warmer =

Medical device for warming fluids to body temperature

A fluid warmer is a medical device used in healthcare facilities for warming fluids, crystalloid, colloid, or blood products, before being administered (intravenously or by other parenteral routes) to body temperature levels to prevent hypothermia in physically traumatized or surgical patients. Infusion fluid warmers are FDA-regulated medical devices, product code LGZ. They are unclassified devices with special considerations and require 510(k) clearance to be legally marketed in the United States. There are two primary categories of fluid warmers- those that warm fluids before use, typically warming cabinets, and those that actively warm fluids while being administered, in-line warming.
