= Pentastarch =

Class of pharmaceutical compounds

Pentastarch is a subgroup of hydroxyethyl starch, with five hydroxyethyl groups out of each 11 hydroxyls, giving it approximately 50% hydroxyethylation. This compares with tetrastarch at 40% and hetastarch at 70% hydroxyethylation, respectively.

It is sold under the name Pentaspan and used for fluid resuscitation. It is considered a plasma expander because it remains primarily intravascular after infusion.

== Choice of resuscitation fluid ==
The choice of fluid (normal saline vs. Ringer's lactate vs. pentaspan) is controversial.

Physiologically, fluid with pentaspan stays primarily in the intravascular space: blood plasma. This is different than normal saline, which shifts quickly into the rest of the extracellular compartment.

Advocates of pentaspan use believe that:

1. the primary deficit in fluid resuscitation is intravascular volume loss and
2. use of normal saline may lead to pulmonary edema, particularly in older patients.

== Normal saline versus pentastarch ==
=== Casualty ===
Pentastarch in the emergency setting is not well studied and its use not of proven benefit. One small study that compared normal saline and pentastarch failed to show any significant survival advantage; however, significantly less volume was required for resuscitation in the pentastarch group.

=== Cardiac surgery ===
A study is currently being done to compare normal saline with pentastarch following cardiac surgery.

== Cost ==
Pentastarch is more expensive than normal saline, but less expensive than albumin.

== See also ==
- Hetastarch
- Intravenous therapy
