= Rehydrex =

Volume expander solution

Rehydrex is a volume expander solution used in intravenous therapy for fluid maintenance and rehydration. It is used to treat dehydration and imbalances in electrolyte levels, and as an energy supplement in the form of glucose.

== Description ==
Clear, colorless to yellowish, isotonic, sterile and pyrogen-free solution. pH: approx. 6. Osmolality: approx. 280 mOsm / kg water. Energy value: about 420 kJ (100 kcal) / 1000 ml, carbohydrate content: 25 g / 1000 ml.

== Active ingredients ==
- Glucose monohydrate (25 mg/ml)
- Sodium acetate trihydrate (3.4 mg/ml)
- Sodium chloride (2.6 mg/ml)

== Side effects ==
- Thrombophlebitis (blood clot and inflammation at the injection site).
- Superhydration (too much fluid in the body), electrolyte imbalance
- Headache, nausea, cramps, listlessness and vomiting
