= T Set =

T Set or T-Set, a homophone of tea set, may refer to:

- Sydney Trains T set, a class of electric multiple unit train run by Sydney Trains
- T-Set (intravenous therapy), a type of Y-Set (intravenous therapy)
- The T-Set, predecessor to British band Pink Floyd

== See also ==
- The dictionary definition of tea set at Wiktionary
- The Booker T. Set, a 1969 album by Booker T. & the M.G.'s
- Tee-Set, a Dutch pop-rock band
- The Harlequin Tea Set, an Agatha Christie story
