= Gelofusine =

Blood volume expander

Gelofusine is a volume expander that is used as a blood plasma replacement if a significant amount of blood is lost due to extreme hemorrhaging, trauma, dehydration, or a similar event. Gelofusine is a 4% w/v solution of succinylated gelatine (also known as modified fluid gelatine) used as an intravenous colloid, and behaves much like blood filled with albumins. As a result, it causes an increase in blood volume, blood flow, cardiac output, and oxygen transportation.

== Administration ==
The dosage is adjusted according to the amount of blood loss. Initially, 500 to 1000 ml is administered on average, and higher doses are applied for more severe blood loss. In children, the safety and efficacy of Gelofusine has not yet been established. Gelofusine is contraindicated in cases of hypersensitivity to the components of the drug, hypervolemia and hyperhydration. (broken link to reference - needs updating)
