= Crystalloid =

Crystalloid may refer to:

- A substance that, when dissolved, forms a true solution and is able to pass through a semipermeable membrane. They get separated from colloids during dialysis.
- Crystalloid solution, a type of volume expander
