= Hydroxyethyl starch =

Pharmaceutical drug

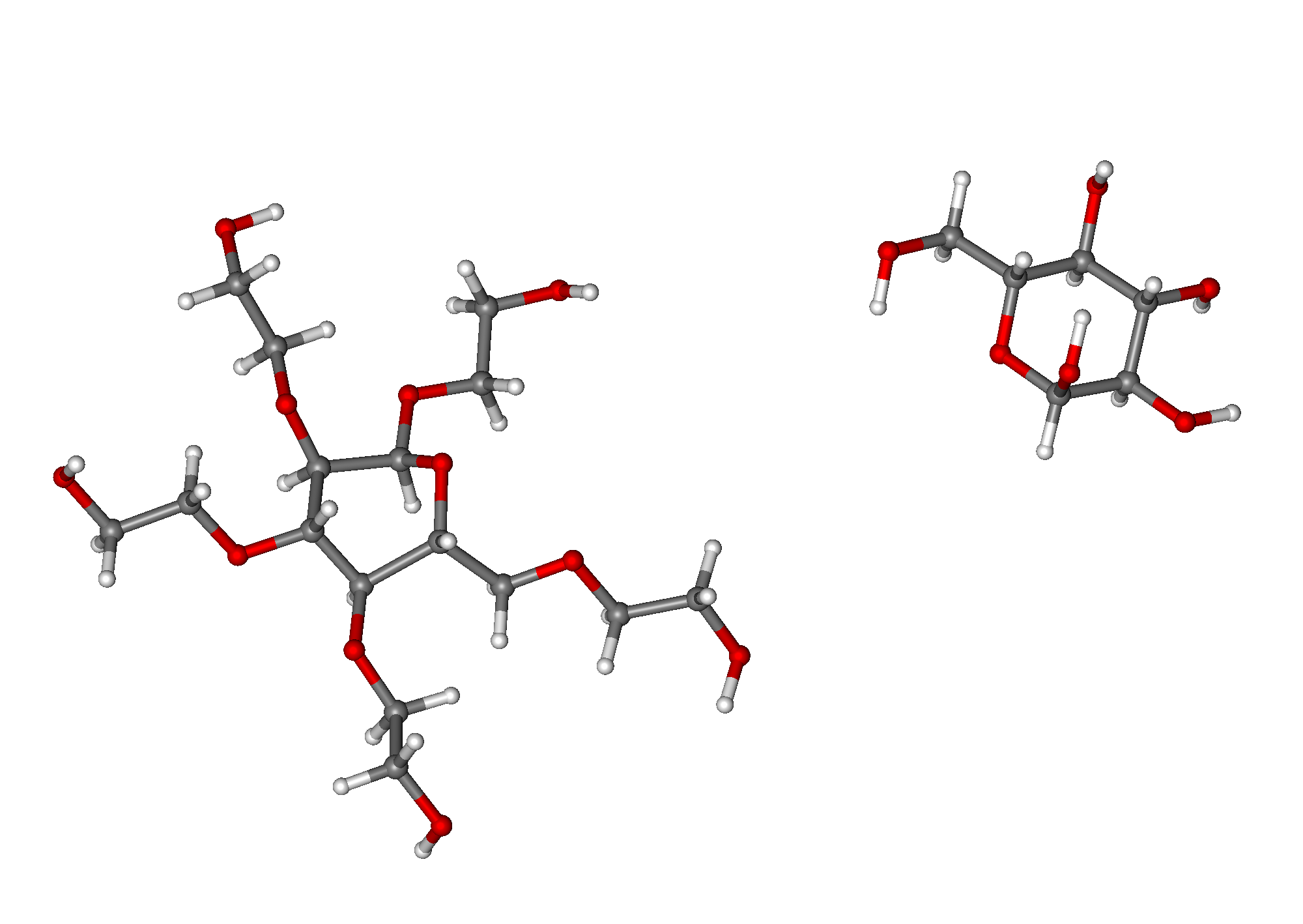

Clinical data
- Trade names: Hespan, Voluven, Volulyte, Tetrahes, Hestar
- Routes of administration: Intravenous
- ATC code: B05AA07 (WHO)

Pharmacokinetic data
- Elimination half-life: 1.4 hrs
- Excretion: Renal

Identifiers
- CAS Number: 9005-27-0
- ChemSpider: 17340832
- UNII: 875Y4127EA
- CompTox Dashboard (EPA): DTXSID3046829
- ECHA InfoCard: 100.120.749

Chemical and physical data
- Molar mass: 130–200 kg/mol (typical)
- 3D model (JSmol): Interactive image
- SMILES: O(CCO)[C@H]1O[C@@H]([C@@H](OCCO)[C@H](OCCO)[C@H]1OCCO)COCCO.OC[C@H]1O[C@H](O)[C@H](O)[C@@H](O)[C@@H]1O
- InChI: InChI=1S/C16H32O11.C6H12O6/c17-1-6-22-11-12-13(23-7-2-18)14(24-8-3-19)15(25-9-4-20)16(27-12)26-10-5-21;7-1-2-3(8)4(9)5(10)6(11)12-2/h12-21H,1-11H2;2-11H,1H2/t12-,13-,14+,15-,16+;2-,3-,4+,5-,6+/m11/s1; Key:DNZMDASEFMLYBU-RNBXVSKKSA-N

Hydroxyethyl starch (HES/HAES), sold under the brand name Voluven among others, is a nonionic starch derivative, used as a volume expander in intravenous therapy. The use of HES on critically ill patients is associated with an increased risk of death and kidney problems.

HES is a general term and can be sub-classified according to average molecular weight, molar substitution, concentration, C2/C6 ratio and Maximum Daily Dose. The European Medicines Agency commenced in June 2013 the process of agreeing to reduced indications which was completed in October 2013. The process of full withdrawal in the EU was expected to complete in 2018.

== Medical uses ==
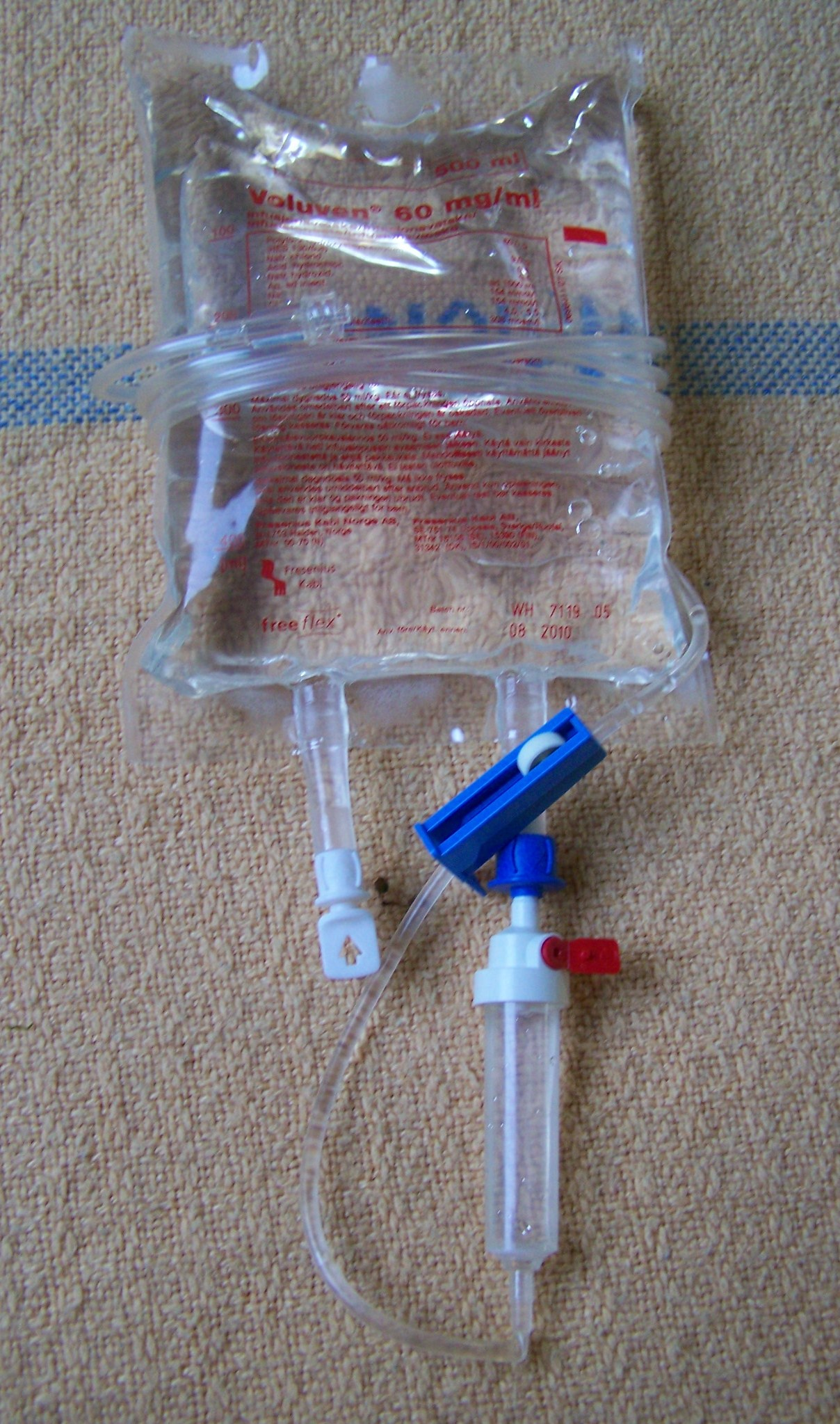
A hydroxyethyl starch solution ready for intravenous infusion.

An intravenous solution of hydroxyethyl starch is used to prevent shock following severe blood loss caused by trauma, surgery, or other problem. It however appears to have greater risk of a poor outcome compared to other intravenous solutions and may increase the risk of death.

== Adverse effects ==
HES can cause anaphylactoid reactions: hypersensitivity, mild influenza-like symptoms, slow heart rate, fast heart rate, spasms of the airways, and non-cardiogenic pulmonary edema. It is also linked to a decrease in hematocrit and disturbances in blood clotting. One liter of 6% solution (Hespan) reduces factor VIII level by 50% and will prolong the aPTT and will also decrease vWF. A coagulation effect of hetastarch administration is direct movement into fibrin clots and a dilutional effect on serum. Hetastarch may lead to platelet dysfunction by causing a reduction in the availability of glycoprotein IIb-IIIa on platelets.

HES derivatives have been demonstrated to have increased rates of acute kidney failure and need for renal replacement therapy and to decrease long-term survival when used alone in cases of severe sepsis compared with Ringer lactate solution. The effects were tested on HES 130kDa/0.42 in people with severe sepsis; analysis showed increased rates of kidney failure and increased mortality when compared to LR. It has been recommended that, since medium-MW HES solutions may be associated with harm, these solutions should not be used routinely for patients with septic shock.

During 2010/11 a large number of research papers associated with Joachim Boldt were retracted for ethical reasons, and this may affect clinical guidelines referring to HES preparations prepared before this date. In 2013 a meta-analysis on HES in critically ill patients showed that only the Boldt studies showed an improvement with HES; all other studies showed significant risks with no benefits.

=== Severe itching ===
Hydroxyethyl starch has been observed to cause severe pruritis, or itching after administration. This can occur even at doses as low as 400mg/kg cumulative dose, and is considered to be possible at any dose, though does become more common at higher cumulative doses. In a review of the accumulation of hydroxyethyl starch in body tissues, it was found that approximately 15% of patients given the drug had deposits of the drug in their skin. These deposits were more common with higher cumulative doses, and in some cases persisted for 4-8 years or more after last administration. It is thought that the mechanism by which itching is caused is related to deposits of hydroxyethyl starch occurring in peripheral nerves, potentially Schwann cells specifically.

This itching can be very severe and is the most common side effect of hydroxyethyl starch. It generally has a delayed onset of at least a few weeks after administration, which increases the difficulty in diagnosing this side effect as people experiencing itching and their doctors may not consider it as a possible cause. In many patients, it is very difficult or impossible to provide relief from the itching or reduce the duration of the itching. Antihistamines have no effect on itching with this cause. Some small studies or single case reports have suggested potential benefit from oral naltrexone or topical capsaicin, but these have yet to be tested in large trials.

=== Contraindications ===
Prescribing information contains the following contraindications:

- This product should not be used in people who are hypersensitive or allergic to hydroxyethyl starch.
- Patients with kidney failure not related to low blood volume and patients on dialysis should avoid this product in high doses which are used for volume expansion.
- Use of hydroxyethyl starch with normal saline in its preparation is contraindicated in people with severe increases in blood levels of sodium or chloride.
- Patients with intracranial bleeds should not use this product.

On 25 November 2013, following a public workshop to discuss new information on the risks and benefits of HES solution, the USFDA announced the addition of a black box warning to the prescribing information which includes the following recommendations to health professionals:

- Do not use HES solutions in critically ill adult patients, including those with sepsis.
- Avoid use in patients with pre-existing renal dysfunction.
- Discontinue use of HES at the first sign of renal injury.
- Need for renal replacement therapy has been reported up to 90 days after HES administration. Continue to monitor renal function for at least 90 days in all patients.
- Avoid use in patients undergoing open heart surgery in association with cardiopulmonary bypass due to excess bleeding.
- Discontinue use of HES at the first sign of coagulopathy.
- Do not use HES products in patients with severe liver disease
- Monitor liver function in patients receiving HES products.

=== Safety concerns ===
High molecular weight HES has been linked to coagulopathy, pruritus, as well as nephrotoxicity, acute renal failure and mortality. On the other hand, low molecular weight HES seems not to demonstrate such adverse effects. However, some suggest that low molecular weight HES poses significant safety concerns. They posit that studies concluding otherwise are not reliable for a number of reasons including "unsuitable comparators, too short observation periods, low cumulative dose and low-risk patients." (Hartog & Reinhart, 2009, p 1340). Recent results of 6S trial seem to confirm these concerns (see below).

In June 2012 a 6S paper was published in the New England Journal of Medicine raising concerns regarding the use of hydroxyethyl starch in sepsis. Specifically, the authors showed that resuscitation with hydroxyethyl starch (as opposed to Ringer's acetate) resulted in an increased risk of death or end stage renal failure. This study used Tetraspan (HES 130/0.42) of the pharmaceutical company B.Braun but the original version of the publication contained the product specification HES 130/0.4. The pharmaceutical company, Fresenius Kabi, that makes a similar product but with the specification HES 130/0.4 is threatening to bring legal action against the author, Anders Perner, as they wanted the misleading use of their product specification to be corrected. The academic community has raised concerns regarding this sort of behavior by a corporation although Fresenius Kabi did not doubt the results of the study.

The CHEST study compared Hes130/0.40 with Saline in 7000 patients. The study was performed in patients that were less sick than in 6s; however, the increase in mortality was similar to 6s. There has also been a significant increase in dialysis rate overall. The increase in creatinine confirmed the pathophysiological rationale. Furthermore, the patients needed more blood products, had significant more liver failure and itching. The study was published in the NEJM in October 2012.

As a consequence, in November 2012 the European Regulatory Agency (EMA) started an Official Procedure to Assess the Safety of all HES Products. The FDA in September 2012 conducted a Public Workshop addressing Safety concerns of HES, which according to the majority of participants should be addressed by regulators. The Surviving Sepsis Campaign decided to ban HES from treatment in sepsis patients.

On 14 June 2013, PRAC, which is the safety committee of EMA, the European regulatory agency, published on their official website the recommendation to suspend the marketing authorisation of all HES products in Europe. The risk benefit ratio is negative based on results of 3 megatrials (VISEP, 6S, CHEST). A clinical benefit could not be demonstrated in any patient population, and there was ample evidence of harm, especially kidney failure due to long-term storage of the product in vital organs severely restricting its potential indications. The FDA followed on 24 June. MHRA recalled the HES products on 27 June as the risks outweigh potential benefits and safer and cheaper alternatives are available. In July 2021 the FDA further restricted the label of HES in the US. Due to side effects also in the patients in the operating room the product should only be used, when no other fluid for volume replacement therapy is available. This restricts HES use to the battle field as an example. Due to this negative label the two largest HES producers deregistered their global HES brands in the US.

The EMA held an ad hoc expert meeting on 18 December 2017, to help inform its further consideration of the issue. Some further longer term data had been published although some trials had yet to complete. On 12 January 2018, PRAC [Pharamocovigilance Risk Assessment Committee] recommended the European Medicine Agency to withdraw the marketing authorization of hydroxyethyl starch containing medicinal products. An issue was that some use appeared to be outside the restricted license, potentially in areas of practice where there was evidence of harm. This may be a global issue as there is evidence that in areas of practice such as post-partum hemorrhage use has continued outside WHO guidelines. The recommendation was adopted by the Mutual Recognition and Decentralized Procedure Co-ordination Group (CMDh) on 26 January 2018. In April 2018, the European Commission requested that the PRAC and the CMDh further consider any possible unmet medical need that could result from a suspension, as well as the feasibility and likely effectiveness of additional risk minimisation measures. After looking at these specific aspects, in May 2018 the PRAC confirmed its previous recommendation for suspension and sent a revised recommendation to the CMDh. The CMDh concluded that HES solutions for infusion should remain on the market provided that a combination of additional measures to protect patients is implemented. The European Commission took an EU-wide legally binding decision on 17 July 2018. On 22 May 2022 EMS banned HES in the EU. In 2018 implemented measures of controlled access to hospitals and training of users did not stop the use in ICU/sepsis patients .to prevent harm from these patients of a drug with no demonstrated clinical benefit, the registrations of all HES in EU are suspended.

== Pharmacokinetics ==
Different types of hydroxyethyl starches are typically described by their average molecular weight, typically around 130 to 200 kDa (bearing in mind that there will be a range of different-sized molecules in any given solution); and their degree of molar substitution (what proportion of the glucose units on the starch molecule have been modified with hydroxyethyl units), typically around 0.35 to 0.5. A solution of hydroxyethyl starch may further be described by its concentration in % (i.e. grams per 100ml). So for example, one commercially available hydroxyethyl starch (Voluven) is described as 6% HES 130 / 0.4.

The elimination depends on molar substitution degree. Molecules smaller than the renal threshold (60–70 kDa) are readily excreted in the urine while a small part of the larger ones are metabolized by plasma α–amylase before those degradation products are renally excreted. However HES is only partly degraded and excreted, while for a large amount the metabolism remains unclear. Approximately one-third to two-thirds of administered HES cannot be accounted for by 24-h urinary excretion. In one study the cumulative excretion over 72 h was 50% of the administered dose. HES has remained detectable in plasma 4 months after infusion, and in skin tissue up to 54 months after HES infusion. Administered HES accumulates in large quantities within diverse tissues where it can persist for periods of several years. Therefore, HES should not be administered for longer than 24 hours.

== See also ==
- Joachim Boldt
- Pentastarch
