= Drip chamber =

Medical device

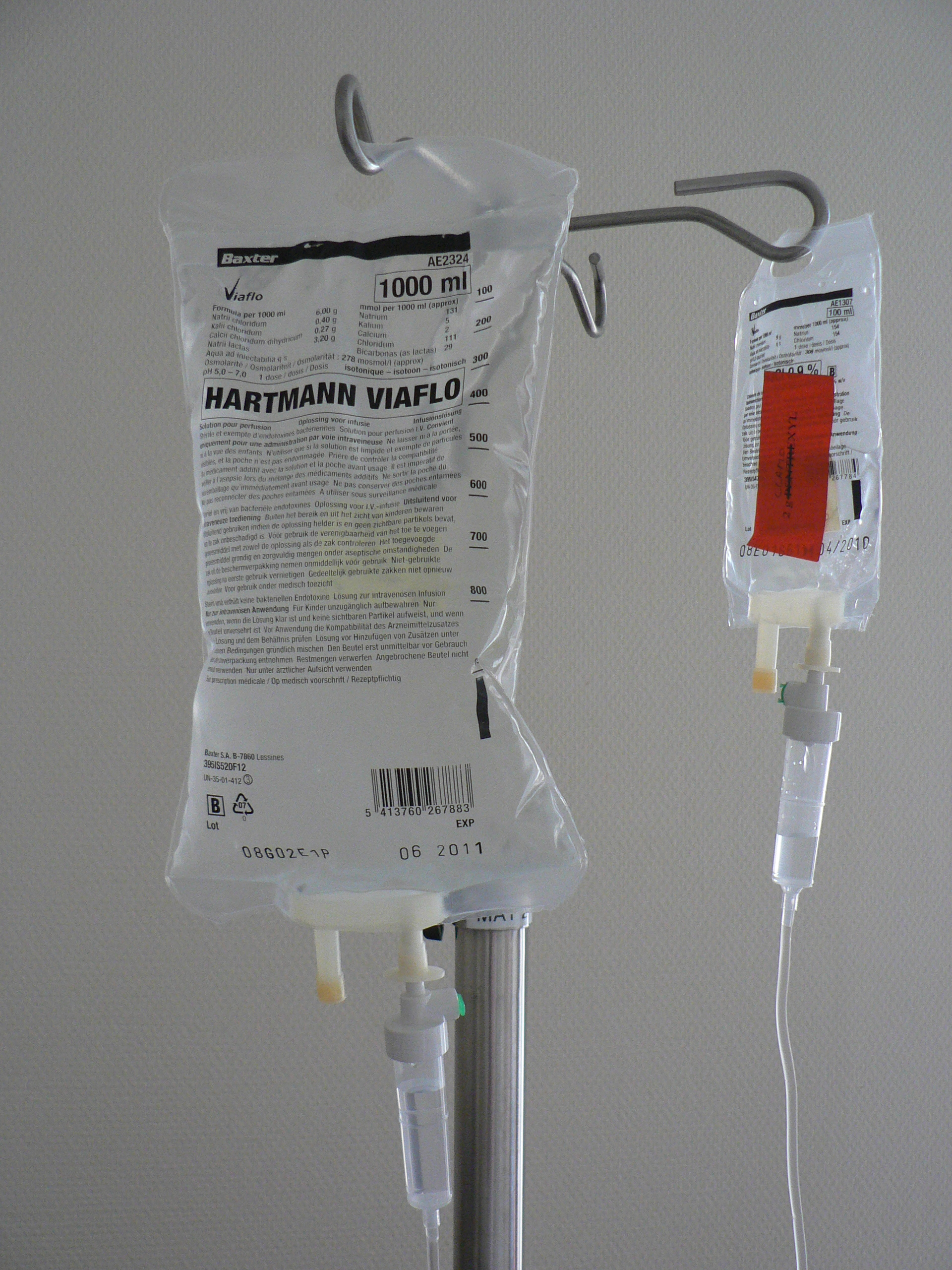
Drip chambers at the bottom of each of two IV bags

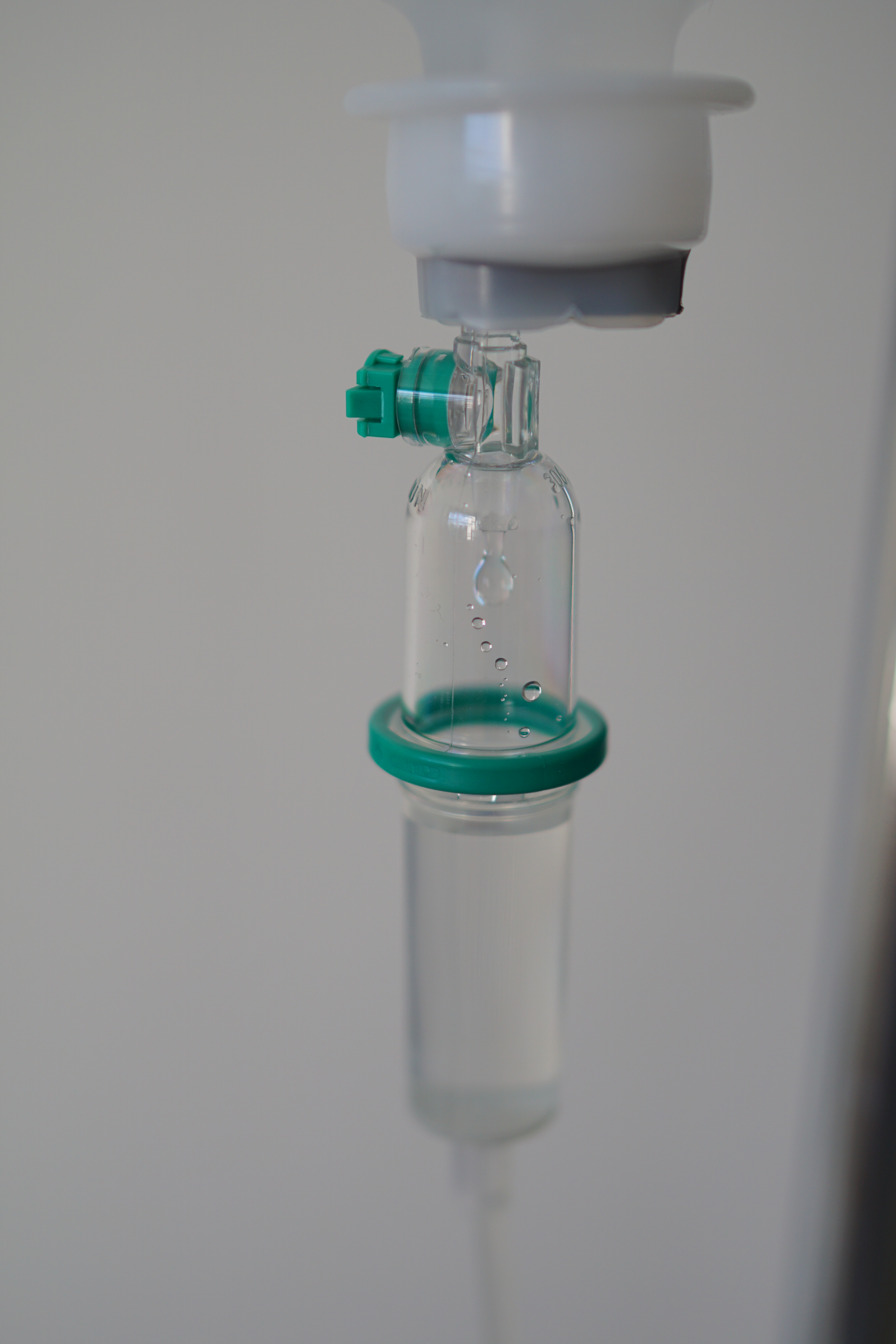
Close-up of a drip chamber

A drip chamber, also known as drip bulb, is a device used to allow gas (such as air) to rise out from a fluid so that it is not passed downstream. It is commonly employed in delivery systems of intravenous therapy and acts to prevent air embolism.

The use of a drip chamber also allows an estimate of the rate at which fluid is administered. For a fluid of a given viscosity, drips from a hole of known size will be of nearly identical volume, and the number of drips in a minute can be counted to gauge the rate of flow. In this instance the rate of flow is usually controlled by a clamp on the infusion tubing; this affects the resistance to flow. However, other sources of resistance (such as whether the vein is kinked or compressed by the patient's position) cannot be so directly controlled and a change in position may change the rate of flow leading to inadvertently rapid or slow infusion. Where this might be problematic an infusion pump can be used which gives a more accurate measurement of flow rate.

Drip chambers can be classified into macro-drip (about 10 to 20 gtts/ml) and micro-drip (about 60 gtts/ml) based on their drop factors. For a given drip chamber (when the fluid drips from the hole into the chamber) drop factor means number of drops per ml of the IV fluid. Flow rate can be calculated with the help of the observations from the drip chamber and its drop factor. The unit of flow rate is gtts/min, where gtts means guttae (Latin plural noun meaning “drops”).
