= John Benjamin Murphy =

American surgeon

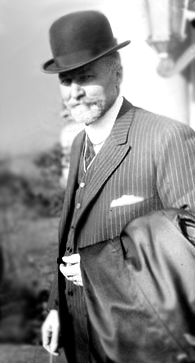
- Murphy outside of Mercy Hospital after Theodore Roosevelt's assassination attempt in 1912
- Born: December 21, 1857; Appleton, Wisconsin, US
- Died: August 11, 1916 (aged 58); Mackinac Island, Michigan, US
- Resting place: Calvary Cemetery
- Education: Rush Medical College, 1879
- Known for: President, American Medical Association artificial pneumothorax appendectomy
- Awards: Order of St. Gregory the Great
- Scientific career
- Workplaces: Mercy hospital, Chief of Staff; Rush Medical College; College of Physicians and Surgeons; Northwestern University Medical School; Cook County Hospital; Graduate Medical School of Chicago

John Benjamin Murphy, born John Murphy (December 21, 1857 – August 11, 1916), was an American physician and abdominal surgeon noted for advocating early surgical intervention in appendicitis appendectomy, and several eponyms: Murphy’s button, Murphy drip, Murphy’s punch, Murphy’s test, and Murphy-Lane bone skid. He is best remembered for the eponymous clinical sign that is used in evaluating patients with acute cholecystitis. His career spanned general surgery, orthopedics, neurosurgery, and cardiothoracic surgery, which helped him to gain international prominence in the surgical profession. Mayo Clinic co-founder William James Mayo called him "the surgical genius of our generation".

Over the course of his career he was renowned as a surgeon, a clinician, a teacher, an innovator, and an author. In addition to general surgical operations, such as appendectomy, cholecystostomy, bowel resection for intestinal obstruction, and mastectomy, he performed and described innovative procedures in neurosurgery, orthopedics, gynecology, urology, plastic surgery, thoracic surgery, and vascular surgery. He also ventured into techniques such as neurorrhaphy, arthroplasty, prostatectomy, nephrectomy, hysterectomy, bone grafting, and thoracoplasty.

== Life and death ==
Murphy was born in a log cabin in Appleton, Wisconsin. His parents, Michael Murphy and Ann Grimes Murphy, were Irish immigrants who escaped from the Great Famine and who later raised him on their own farm. He was tall and strong with a red beard and mustache.

Murphy died of heart disease in Mackinac Island, Michigan after having been ill for six months. He was staying at the Grand Hotel and was attended by his wife, L. L. MacArthur and James Keefe. After he suffered from angina pectoris for several years, his death was attributed to aortitis. Two days prior to his death he correctly predicted the findings of his own autopsy: "I think the necropsy will show plaques in my aorta."

== Education and training ==
Murphy attended public school in Appleton and graduated from Appleton High School in 1876. He obtained a doctorate from Rush Medical College in 1879 and entered an eighteen-month internship at Cook County Hospital. He then practiced there briefly. From 1882–1884 he performed practical work at universities and hospitals in Vienna, Munich, Berlin and Heidelberg. Most of this time was spent working in Vienna with Theodor Billroth, who introduced gastrectomy techniques that are still in use today.

== Academic career ==
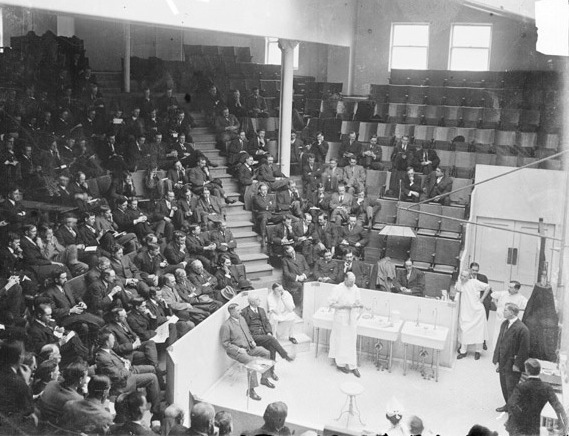
Murphy conducting a clinic at Mercy Hospital, looking at something he is holding in his hands

After his sojourn in Europe, he returned to the US to start a general practice. He was quickly recognized as a leader in abdominal surgery and was appointed lecturer in surgery at Rush Medical College at the end of 1884. In 1890 he was elected Professor of Surgery. In 1892, he was named Professor of Clinical Surgery at the College of Physicians and Surgeons (currently University of Illinois College of Medicine). By 1899, he had become acclaimed for bone surgery. From 1901–1905 he held a position at the Northwestern University Medical School. From 1905–1908, he worked at Rush Medical College, and from 1908–1916 he returned to Northwestern University Medical School. Meanwhile, he also taught at the Graduate Medical School of Chicago, and from 1895 until his death in 1916, he was the surgeon-in-chief at the Mercy Hospital. From 1908 on he also held a commission in the Army Reserve Medical Corps.

While at Mercy, he developed a following for his "wet clinics", in which he operated and lectured to an audience. Physicians from around the world attended these sessions. The only method for wider dissemination of these lectures and demonstrations was print publication. A secretary transcribed his words, and they were printed as "The Surgical Clinics of John B. Murphy, M.D., at Mercy Hospital, Chicago". This became 'The Surgical Clinics of Chicago", and, subsequently, the "Surgical Clinics of North America", which continue as of 2019.

== Experiences ==
Early in his career, on May 4, 1886, he was one of the doctors summoned to the scene of the Haymarket Affair in the Near West Side community area of Chicago. He dressed approximately 30 men while working until 3:30 am. A bomb had been thrown at the Chicago Police officers leading to several deaths and a high-profile trial, in which Murphy was called to testify. The labor unrest leading up to and surrounding the events led to the tradition of May Day labor rallies.

After an October 14, 1912 assassination attempt on former United States President Theodore Roosevelt in Milwaukee, Wisconsin, Roosevelt was brought to Chicago's Mercy Hospital. When he asked Roosevelt about any fears he might have about his bullet wound he said that Roosevelt responded, "I've hunted long enough, Doctor, to know that you can't kill a Bull Moose with a short gun."

== Legacy ==
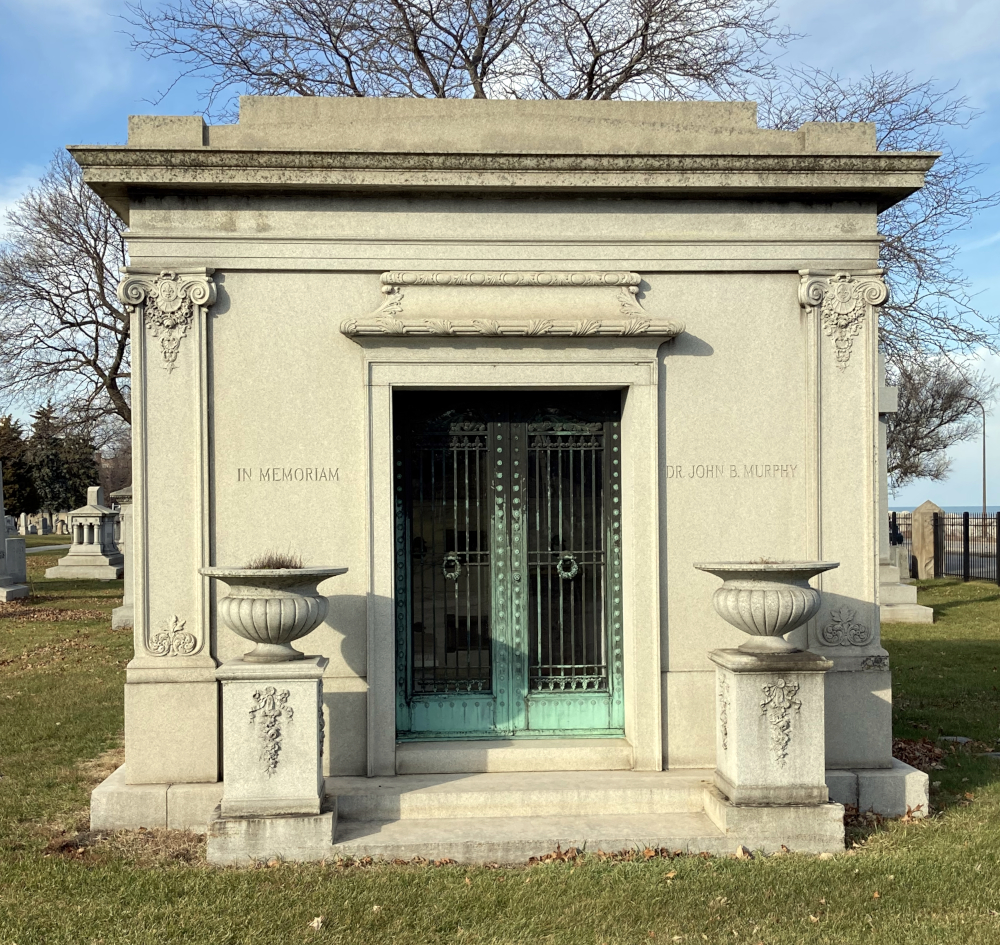
Murphy mausoleum at Calvary Cemetery in Evanston

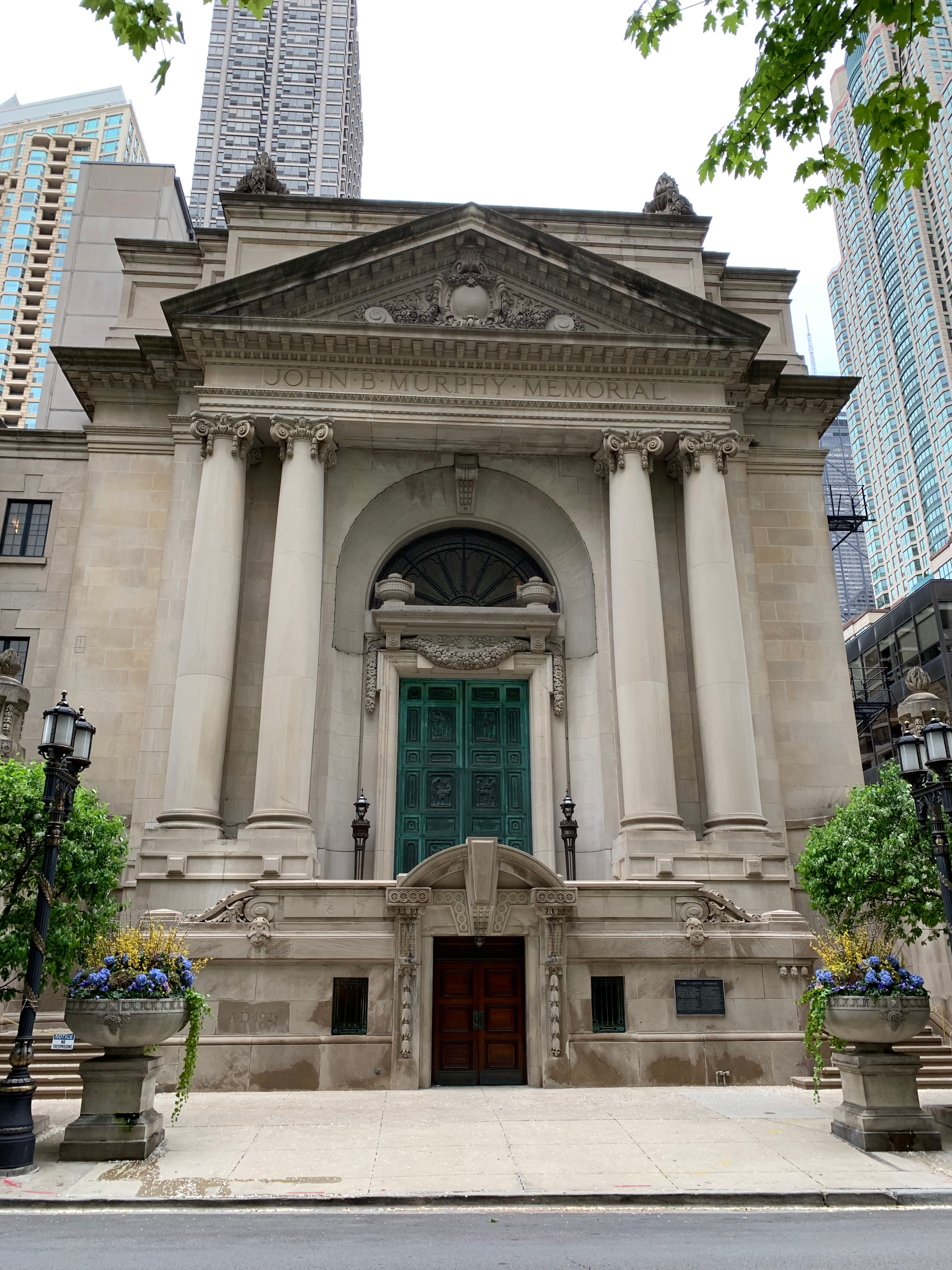
The John B. Murphy Memorial building, at 50 East Erie Street in Chicago. As of May 2019 it is an event space called "The Murphy"

Although his surgical prowess was not questioned, his approach to practice was considered pretentious by a segment of his professional colleagues in the U.S., and his work was more highly regarded by his contemporaries in Europe than in the US. He was an early advocate of intervention via the removal of the appendix in all cases of appendicitis. His thoughts were controversial in a time of conservative management of appendicitis. Having been met with skepticism after his first presentation of appendectomy, he gathered evidence from 250 cases and presented his opinions again as an authority on the subject.

A number of procedures and devices were named after Murphy, including Murphy’s button (a mechanical device used for intestinal anastomosis), Murphy’s punch (a punch tenderness at the costo-vertebral angle in cases of perinephric abscess), Murphy's sign (a sign of inflammation of the gallbladder), Murphy’s test (a test for deep-seated tenderness and muscular rigidity in cases of perinephric abscess), Murphy drip for administration of fluids by proctoclysis in patients with peritonitis, and Murphy-Lane bone skid (a common commercial steel instrument used for femoral head procedures).

Murphy developed his eponymous anastomotic button for a sutureless anastomosis of the gallbladder to the duodenum (his preferred treatment for acute cholecystitis), but it was equally suitable for intestinal anastomoses. He developed it in the experimental animal laboratory in a barn behind his house and first used it less than a week after developing it on a dog. The Murphy button can be credited as the forerunner of the modern end-to-end stapling instrument after having become the method of choice for operations at the Mayo Clinic and elsewhere in the United States for over twenty years.

In 1896, Murphy was the first person to successfully unite a femoral artery severed by a gunshot wound. In 1898, Murphy was first in the United States to induce artificial immobilization and collapse of the lung (pneumothorax) in treatment of pulmonary tuberculosis. He pioneered bone grafting techniques and made inroads in the management of ankylosis, especially with reconstruction. He was also considered an innovator for surgical intervention for prostate cancer, performance of end-to-end anastomosis of hollow viscera.

In 1912, he performed what was arguably the first biliary tract endoscopy. He was a founding member of the American College of Surgeons.

== Honors ==
He was knighted with the Order of St. Gregory the Great at the direction of Pope Benedict XV by Archbishop George Mundelein on June 16, 1916. He was awarded Laetare Medal by the University of Notre Dame in 1902, and a Doctor of Science by University of Sheffield, England in 1908.

Although Murphy's flamboyant demeanour, and consequent unpopularity, among his colleagues kept him from early membership in several professional associations, he was eventually elected President of both the Chicago Medical Society and the American Medical Association (AMA).The American Surgical Association belatedly granted Murphy membership.

The John B. Murphy Public School in the Irving Park community on the northwest side of Chicago, which opened in 1924, was named in his honor.
