= Murphy drip =

Rectal infusion apparatus

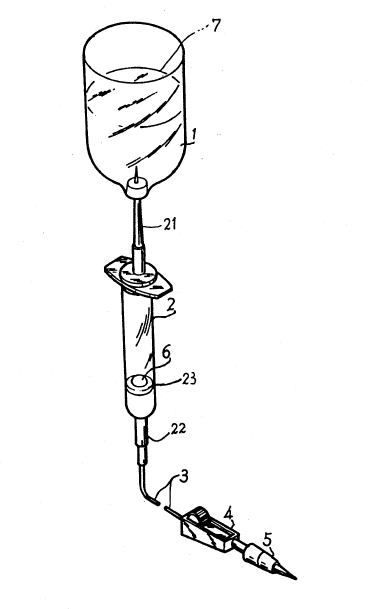
A Murphy drip apparatus

A Murphy drip is a rectal infusion apparatus to administer the medical procedure of proctoclysis, also known as rectoclysis. During the procedure, an end of the Murphy drip is inserted into the rectum and large quantities of liquid are infused into the rectum drop by drop. Prior to fluids or medicines being given intravenously, the Murphy drip and hypodermoclysis were the prime routes to administer fluids such as for replacement when patients could not be fed by mouth. American surgeon John Benjamin Murphy introduced the drip method of saline infusion per rectum in the treatment of peritonitis. The Murphy drip can be used for administering drugs by this route and the apparatus is also used in conjunction with a catheter for bladder irrigation. The term can be applied to apparatus used to administer fluids intravenously.

== History ==
The Murphy drip was invented by American surgeon John Benjamin Murphy, for the purpose of administering a proctoclysis for hydration and replenishment of electrolytes, via a sodium and calcium chloride solution. This would be used when administration by mouth was not possible because of the condition of the patient. The Murphy drip was described in the April 1909 issue of the Journal of the American Medical Association. By as early as July 1928, the Murphy drip was considered an auxiliary method of injection behind intravenous therapy and subcutaneous injection, the two principal methods of injection at that time.

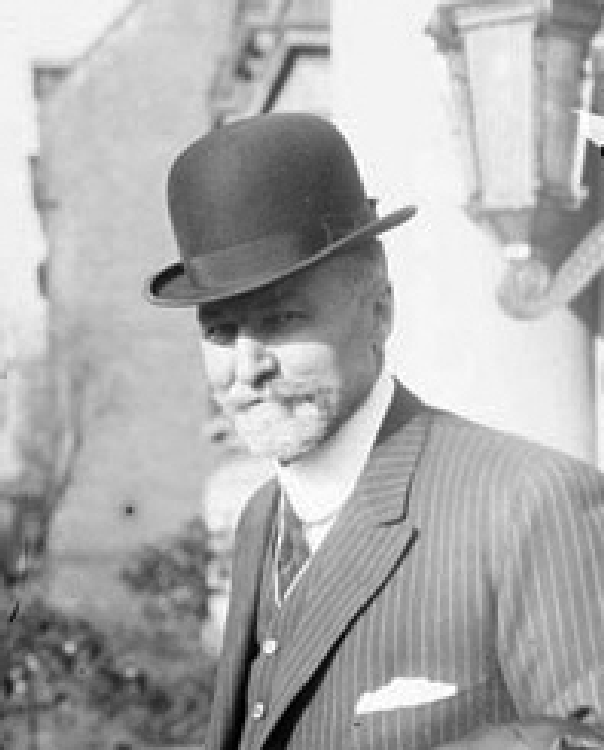
John Murphy, inventor of the Murphy drip

== Set-up ==
A description of a Murphy drip set-up is contained in the 1932 Kansas Supreme Court legal case Ratliffe v. Wesley Hospital and Nurses' Training School:

On February 14, 1929, "Dr. Horn directed the nurse to use the proctoclysis, known as the “Murphy drip.” While the operation was in progress a student nurse in the employ of the hospital prepared the room for the return of the appellant. The proctoclysis set was a part of the equipment of the hospital and was assembled and placed at or near the foot of the bed by the student nurse. The proctoclysis set consists of a standard which is an iron pole setting on a tripod containing hooks at intervals, and on these hooks by means of a chain, tape, string, or piece of gauze is hung a can containing hot water and soda solution. From this can a tube extends which is inserted in the rectum of the patient to whom the proctoclysis is administered. It was necessary to keep the solution hot in order that it would have a body temperature after dropping through the tube and entering the body. ... It was not unusual for the vessel holding the water to be fastened to the standard by gauze, string, or other bandage, although a part of the vessels were equipped with chains."
