= Needleless connector =

In medicine, a needleless connector connects to the end of vascular catheters and enable catheter access for infusion and aspiration. Needleless connectors (also known as NC's) were developed to reduce needlestick injuries, which occur when the skin is accidentally punctured by a used needle. Needlestick injuries can be very serious and potentially expose a healthcare professional to bloodborne infectious diseases such as HIV/AIDS, hepatitis B and hepatitis C.

The needless connector should provide safe access to the catheter without the use of needles and enable the following:

- Minimize catheter occlusion risk.
- Allow for easy and effective decontamination between each use to prohibit microbial entry e.g. via a flat surface which is flush with the housing.

Before utilizing a needleless connector, it is important to properly disinfect the device to help prevent central line-associated bloodstream infection.

Various designs for the needless connector and its components have been developed over the years. This includes a patent developed by Karl Leinsing for "needleless connector" which relates generally to connectors of the type used in the handling and administration of parenteral fluids, and more particularly, to a valve mechanism incorporated within such connector for~~enabling a fluid interconnection to be made therewith without the use of a sharp cannula.

== See also ==
- French catheter scale
- Gastrostomy
- G-Tube
- Jejunostomy
- Stent
