= Plasma-lyte =

Crystalloid solution

Plasma-Lyte is a crystalloid solution for intravenous infusion, with varying electrolyte formulation depending on market. Generally the solution has a composition that mimics human physiological plasma electrolyte concentrations, osmolality and pH.

It is manufactured and marketed by Baxter International Inc. and available as a generic medication.

== Plasma-lyte 148 (pH7.4) ==
Plasma-Lyte 148 is a market-specific solution available in the United Kingdom and Australia, among others and has the following composition:

- Sodium 140 mmol/L
- Potassium 5 mmol/L
- Magnesium 1.5 mmol/L
- Chloride 98 mmol/L
- Acetate 27 mmol/L
- Gluconate 23 mmol/L

A Plasma-Lyte 148 with 5% glucose is also manufactured by Baxter.
