= Joachim Boldt =

German anesthesiologist known for research misconduct

- Born: 29 September 1954 (age 71)
- Known for: Falsifying scientific data
- Scientific career
- Fields: Anesthesiology
- Workplaces: Ludwigshafen Hospital; University of Giessen

Joachim Boldt (born 29 September 1954) is a German anesthesiologist who fabricated or falsified data, including those reporting clinical trial results.

== Medical research fabrication ==
Boldt was previously considered a leading specialist in intravenous fluid management, and was an advocate for the use of colloidal hydroxyethyl starch (HES) to boost blood pressure during surgery. However, a meta-analysis of trials that excluded Boldt's fabricated data found that the intravenous use of hydroxyethyl starch is associated with a significant increased risk of death and acute kidney injury compared with other resuscitation solutions. He was stripped of his professorship and came under criminal investigation for possible forgery of up to 90 research studies.

The editors of 16 different scientific journals, including Anesthesia & Analgesia, Anaesthesia, the European Journal of Anaesthesiology, and the British Journal of Anaesthesia, allege that 89 of 102 studies published by Boldt contained research without proper institutional review board approval.

On 10 November 2010 Boldt was suspended from Klinikum Ludwigshafen, a hospital in Ludwigshafen, Germany, for a scientific publication in Anesthesia & Analgesia with insufficient background research. His field of research and the publications were related to hydroxyethyl starch. Some 90 studies he published were being reviewed by medical authorities in 2011.

In February 2011, Boldt was stripped of his title of professor at the University of Giessen for failing to teach, and the university investigated possible charges of scientific misconduct. His case was described as "possibly the biggest medical research scandal since Andrew Wakefield was struck off in 2010 for falsely claiming to have proved a link between the MMR vaccine and autism".

In August 2012, the hospital released the results of the investigation: while it did not find that any patients were harmed, "in a large number of the studies investigated, the conduct of research failed to meet required standards. False data were published in at least 10 of the 91 articles examined, including, for instance, data on patient numbers/study groups as well as data on the timing of measurements".

On 20 February 2013, JAMA published a meta-analysis on HES in critically ill patients. Boldt had seven studies from the 1990s that had not yet been retracted. If Boldt's papers were included in the analysis no increase in mortality was apparent; but if they were excluded, mortality was seen to increase significantly with use of HES. The Boldt studies, but no others, showed an improvement with HES; all other studies showed significant risks with no benefits. It is considered that his fraudulent studies caused harm and risk to critically ill patients.

An overview of the challenges that this fraud presented for the meta-analysts was published in 2013. The fraud included double publication of studies, manipulating demographic and outcome data to conceal double publication, and showing better results for a drug being tested.

By 2017, 96 of Boldt's papers had been retracted. In October 2018, a review highlighted additional retractions, dating back to 1986, demonstrating persistent fraud since the start of Boldt's career. Statistical analyses found that it was likely that many fraudulent papers from Boldt remained, and recommended that editors should take action. However, some of Boldt's papers were not retracted until 2023. As of August 2023, 199 of Boldt's research publications had been retracted—a record for the author with the most retractions. This count was increased to 222 retractions as of Dec 2025 and further increased to 239 in May 2026.

== See also ==
- List of scientific misconduct incidents
