= Holliday-Segar formula =

Formula to help approximate water and caloric loss using a patient's body weight

The Holliday-Segar formula is a formula to help approximate water and caloric loss (and therefore the water requirements) using a patient's body weight. Primarily aimed at pediatric patients, the Holliday-Segar formula is the most commonly used estimate of daily caloric requirements. To date, the formula continues to be recommended in the current clinical practice guidelines of the American Academy of Pediatrics, American Society of Parenteral and Enteral Nutrition, and National Health Service. Developed in 1957 by Drs. Malcolm A. Holliday and William E. Segar while at the Indiana University School of Medicine, the researchers concluded a non-linear relationship between energy expenditure and weight alone to determine fluid requirements.

The Holliday-Segar Formula
For each kilogram in this range	Daily caloric cost per kilogram
Below 10 kg	100 kcal/kg/day
10–20 kg	50 kcal/kg/day
Above 20 kg	20 kcal/kg/day

== Worked example ==
To estimate the daily fluid requirements of a 9-year-old boy who weights 32 kg, 10*100 + 10*50 + 12*20 = 1740 kcal per day. At a 1 kcal / 1 mL conversion, the daily H_{2}O requirements would therefore be 1740 mL.

== Limitations ==
While generalizable to most cohorts, the Holliday-Segar formula may inadequately estimate caloric requirements in patients affected by fever, hypothermia, or increased activity states (i.e., hyperthyroidism or status epilepticus). The formula can also only be applied to patients above 2 weeks of age.
