= Intravenous therapy =

Medication administered into a vein

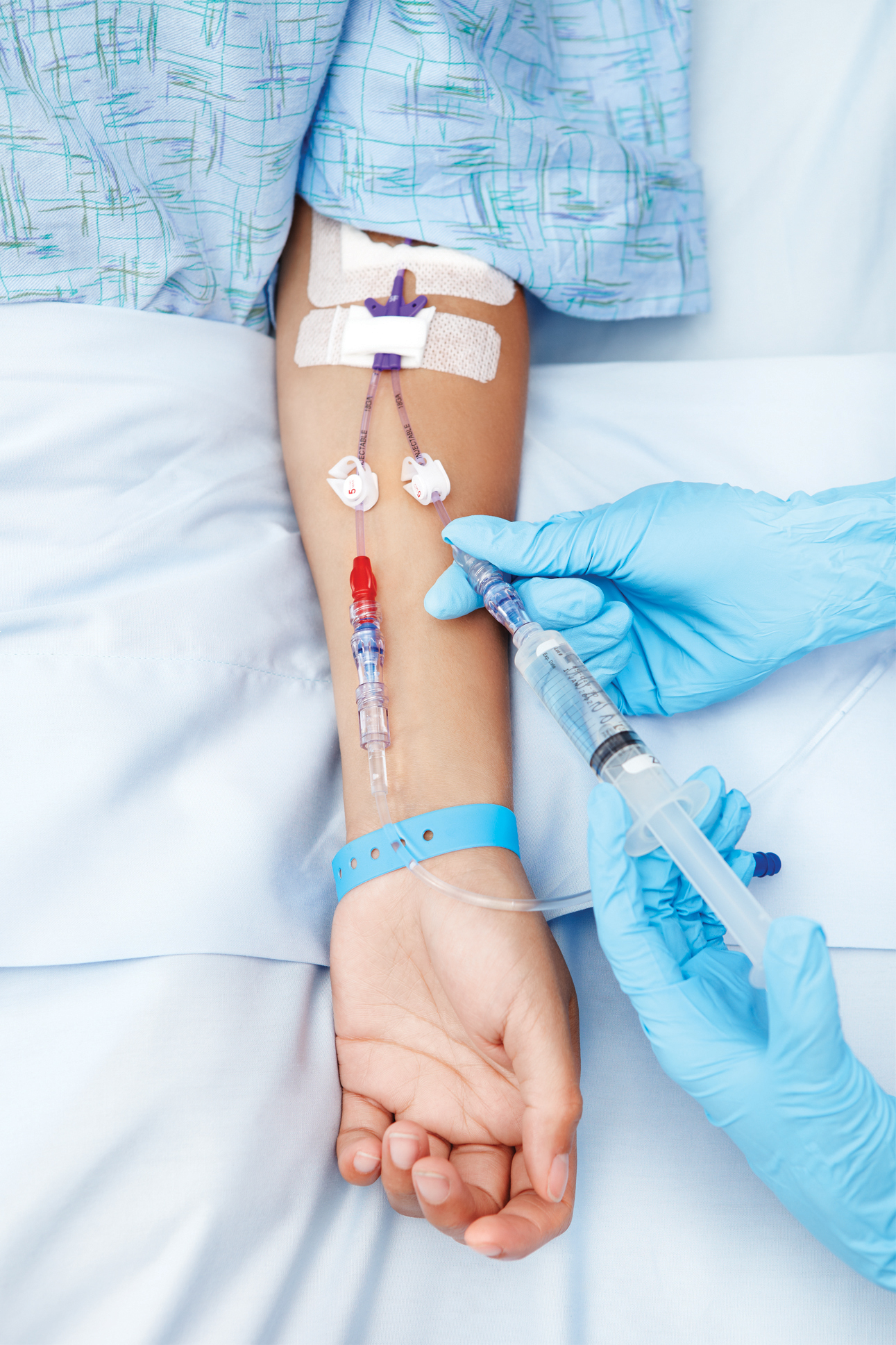
- A person receiving a medication through an intravenous line (cannula)
- Other names: IV therapy
- ICD-9-CM: 38.93
- MeSH: D007262

Intravenous therapy (abbreviated as IV therapy) is a medical process that administers fluids, medications and nutrients directly into a person's vein. The intravenous route of administration is commonly used for rehydration or to provide nutrients for those who cannot, or will not—due to reduced mental states or otherwise—consume food or water by mouth. It may also be used to administer medications or other medical therapy such as blood products or electrolytes to correct electrolyte imbalances. Attempts at providing intravenous therapy have been recorded as early as the 1400s, but the practice did not become widespread until the 1900s after the development of techniques for safe, effective use.

The intravenous route is the fastest way to deliver medications and fluid replacement throughout the body as they are introduced directly into the circulatory system and thus quickly distributed. For this reason, the intravenous route of administration is also used for the consumption of some recreational drugs. Many therapies are administered as a "bolus" or one-time dose, but they may also be administered as an extended infusion or drip. The act of administering a therapy intravenously, or placing an intravenous line ("IV line") for later use, is a procedure which should only be performed by a skilled professional. The most basic intravenous access consists of a needle piercing the skin and entering a vein which is connected to a syringe or to external tubing. This is used to administer the desired therapy. In cases where a patient is likely to receive many such interventions in a short period (with consequent risk of trauma to the vein), normal practice is to insert a cannula which leaves one end in the vein, and subsequent therapies can be administered easily through tubing at the other end. In some cases, multiple medications or therapies are administered through the same IV line.

IV lines are classified as "central lines" if they end in a large vein close to the heart, or as "peripheral lines" if their output is to a small vein in the periphery, such as the arm. An IV line can be threaded through a peripheral vein to end near the heart, which is termed a "peripherally inserted central catheter" or PICC line. If a person is likely to need long-term intravenous therapy, a medical port may be implanted to enable easier repeated access to the vein without having to pierce the vein repeatedly. A catheter can also be inserted into a central vein through the chest, which is known as a tunneled line. The specific type of catheter used and site of insertion are affected by the desired substance to be administered and the health of the veins in the desired site of insertion.

Placement of an IV line may cause pain, as it necessarily involves piercing the skin. Infections and inflammation (termed phlebitis) are also both common side effects of an IV line. Phlebitis may be more likely if the same vein is used repeatedly for intravenous access, and can eventually develop into a hard cord which is unsuitable for IV access. The unintentional administration of a therapy outside a vein, termed extravasation or infiltration, may cause other side effects.

== Uses ==
=== Medical uses ===
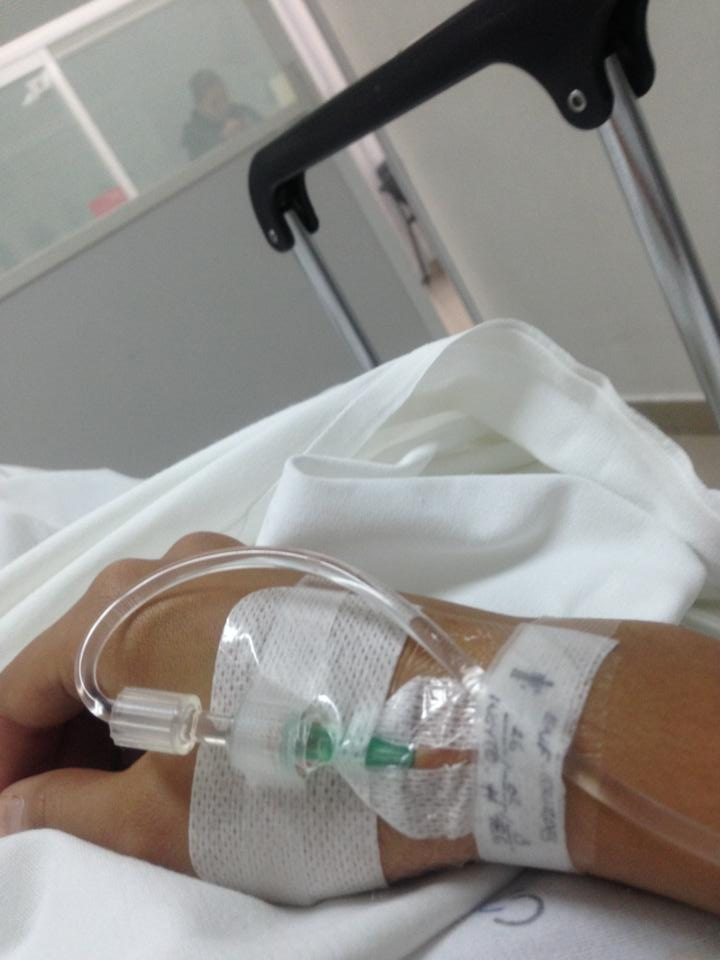
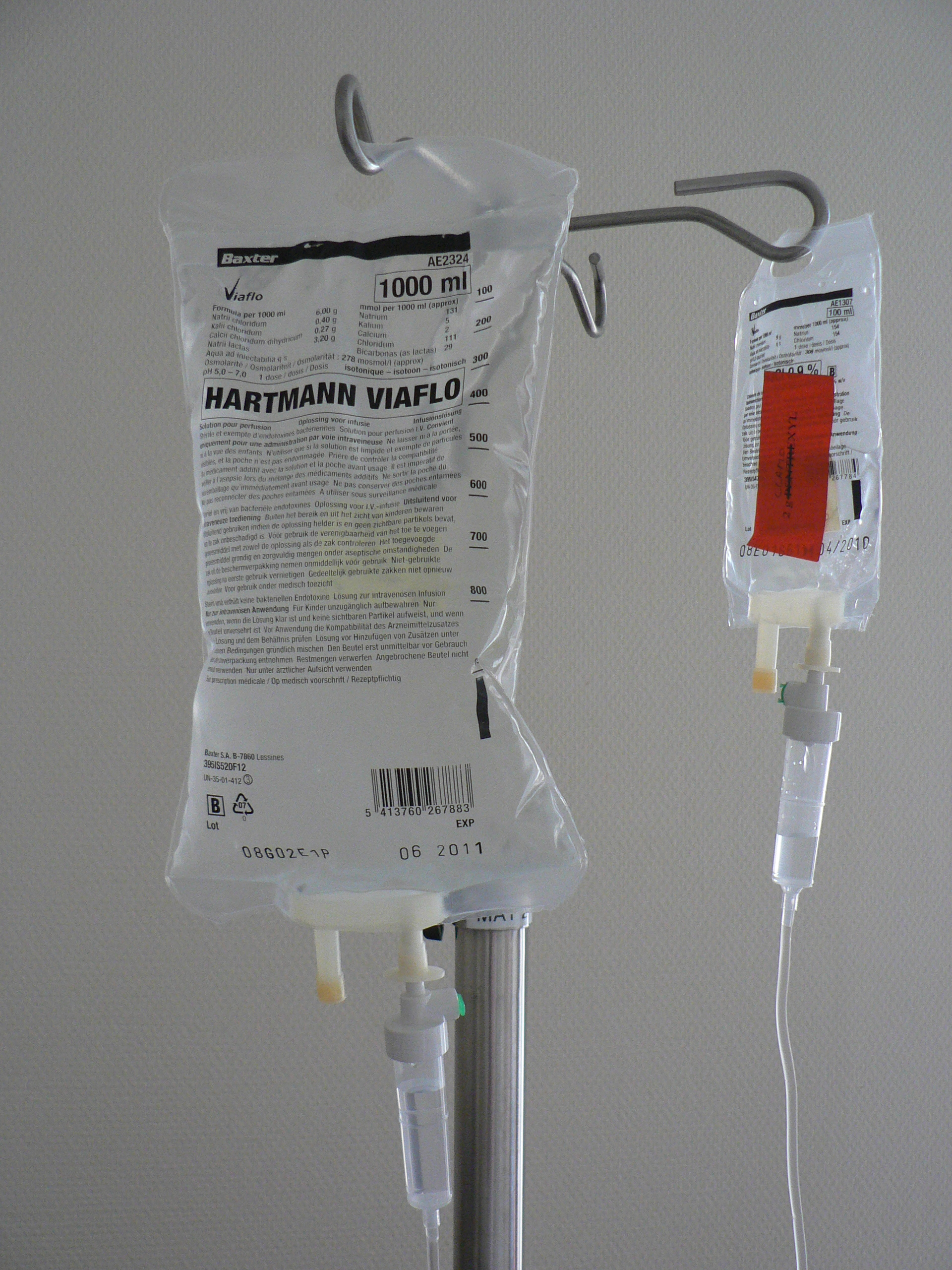
Left: A person receiving fluids through an intravenous line in the wrist. Right: IV bags on a pole connected to IV lines.

Intravenous (IV) access is used to administer medications and fluid replacement which must be distributed throughout the body, especially when rapid distribution is desired. Another use of IV administration is the avoidance of first-pass metabolism in the liver. Substances that may be infused intravenously include volume expanders, blood-based products, blood substitutes, medications and nutrition.

==== Fluid solutions ====
Fluids may be administered as part of "volume expansion", or fluid replacement, through the intravenous route. Volume expansion consists of the administration of fluid-based solutions or suspensions designed to target specific areas of the body which need more water. There are two main types of volume expander: crystalloids and colloids. Crystalloids are aqueous solutions of mineral salts or other water-soluble molecules. Colloids contain larger insoluble molecules, such as gelatin. Blood itself is considered a colloid.

The most commonly used crystalloid fluid is normal saline, a solution of sodium chloride at 0.9% concentration, which is isotonic with blood. Lactated Ringer's (also known as Ringer's lactate) and the closely related Ringer's acetate, are mildly hypotonic solutions often used in those who have significant burns. Colloids preserve a high colloid osmotic pressure in the blood, while, on the other hand, this parameter is decreased by crystalloids due to hemodilution. Crystalloids generally are much cheaper than colloids.

Buffer solutions which are used to correct acidosis or alkalosis are also administered through intravenous access. Lactated Ringer's solution used as a fluid expander or base solution to which medications are added also has some buffering effect. Another solution administered intravenously as a buffering solution is sodium bicarbonate.

==== Medication and treatment ====
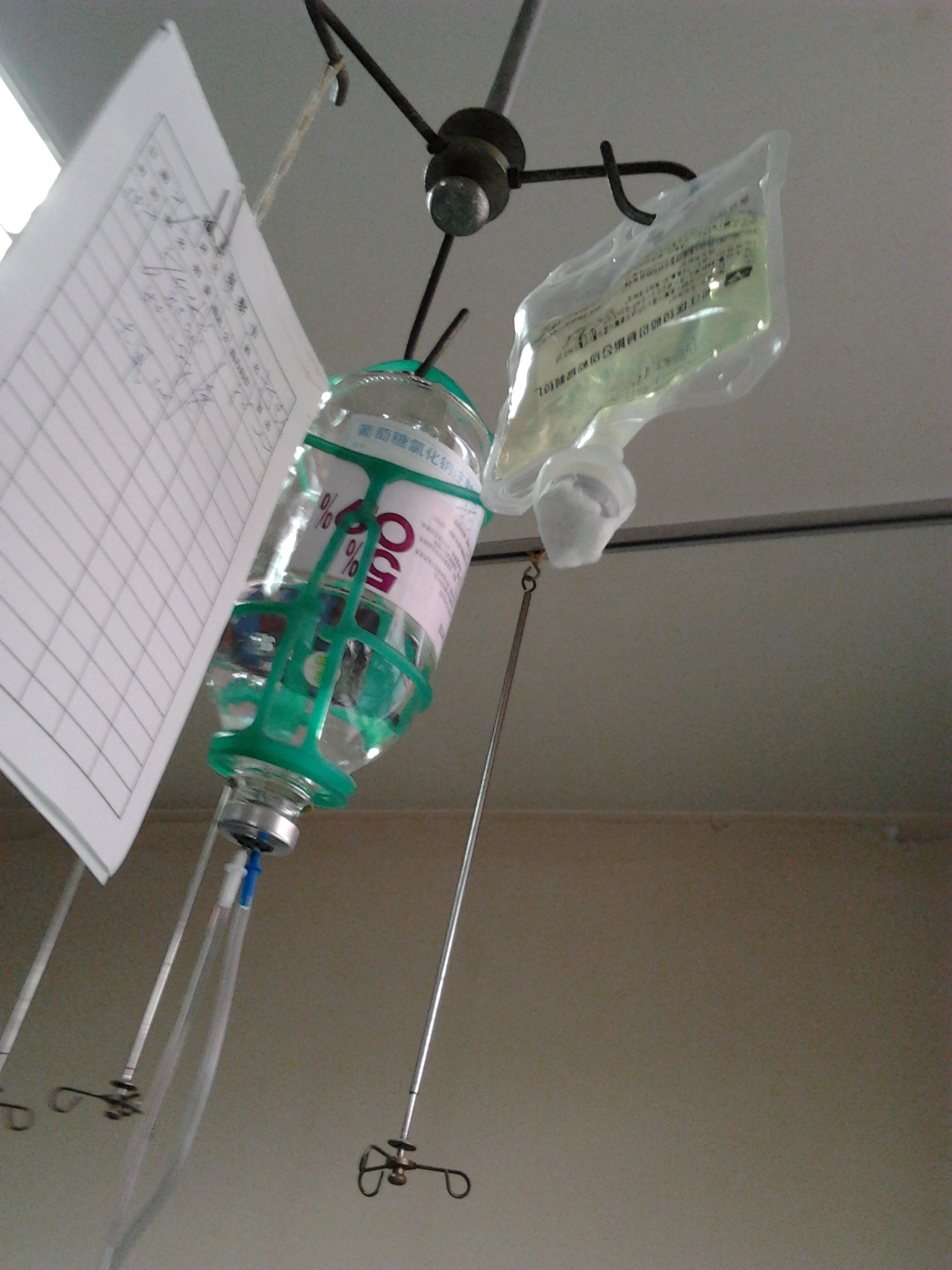
Saline and 5% dextrose solution (left), levofloxacin 750mg (right), and log sheet hanging from an IV pole

Medications may be mixed into the fluids mentioned above, commonly normal saline, or dextrose solutions. Compared with other routes of administration, such as oral medications, the IV route is the fastest way to deliver fluids and medications throughout the body. For this reason, the IV route is commonly preferred in emergency situations or when a fast onset of action is desirable. In extremely high blood pressure (termed a hypertensive emergency), IV antihypertensives may be given to quickly decrease the blood pressure in a controlled manner to prevent organ damage. In atrial fibrillation, IV amiodarone may be administered to attempt to restore normal heart rhythm. IV medications can also be used for chronic health conditions such as cancer, for which chemotherapy drugs are commonly administered intravenously. In some cases, such as with vancomycin, a loading or bolus dose of medicine is given before beginning a dosing regimen to more quickly increase the concentration of medication in the blood.

The bioavailability of an IV medication is by definition 100%, unlike oral administration where medication may not be fully absorbed, or may be metabolized prior to entering the bloodstream. For some medications, there is virtually zero oral bioavailability. For this reason certain types of medications can only be given intravenously, as there is insufficient uptake by other routes of administration, such is the case of severe dehydration where the patient is required to be treated via IV therapy for a quick recovery. The unpredictability of oral bioavailability in different people is also a reason for a medication to be administered IV, as with furosemide. Oral medications also may be less desirable if a person is nauseous or vomiting, or has severe diarrhea, as these may prevent the medicine from being fully absorbed from the gastrointestinal tract. In these cases, a medication may be given IV only until the patient can tolerate an oral form of the medication. The switch from IV to oral administration is usually performed as soon as viable, as there is generally cost and time savings over IV administration. Whether a medication can be potentially switched to an oral form is sometimes considered when choosing appropriate antibiotic therapy for use in a hospital setting, as a person is unlikely to be discharged if they still require IV therapy.

Some medications, such as aprepitant, are chemically modified to be better suited for IV administration, forming a prodrug such as fosaprepitant. This can be for pharmacokinetic reasons or to delay the effect of the drug until it can be metabolized into the active form.

==== Blood products ====
A blood product (or blood-based product) is any component of blood which is collected from a donor for use in a blood transfusion. Blood transfusions can be used in massive blood loss due to trauma, or can be used to replace blood lost during surgery. Blood transfusions may also be used to treat a severe anaemia or thrombocytopenia caused by a blood disease. Early blood transfusions consisted of whole blood, but modern medical practice commonly uses only components of the blood, such as packed red blood cells, fresh frozen plasma or cryoprecipitate.

==== Nutrition ====
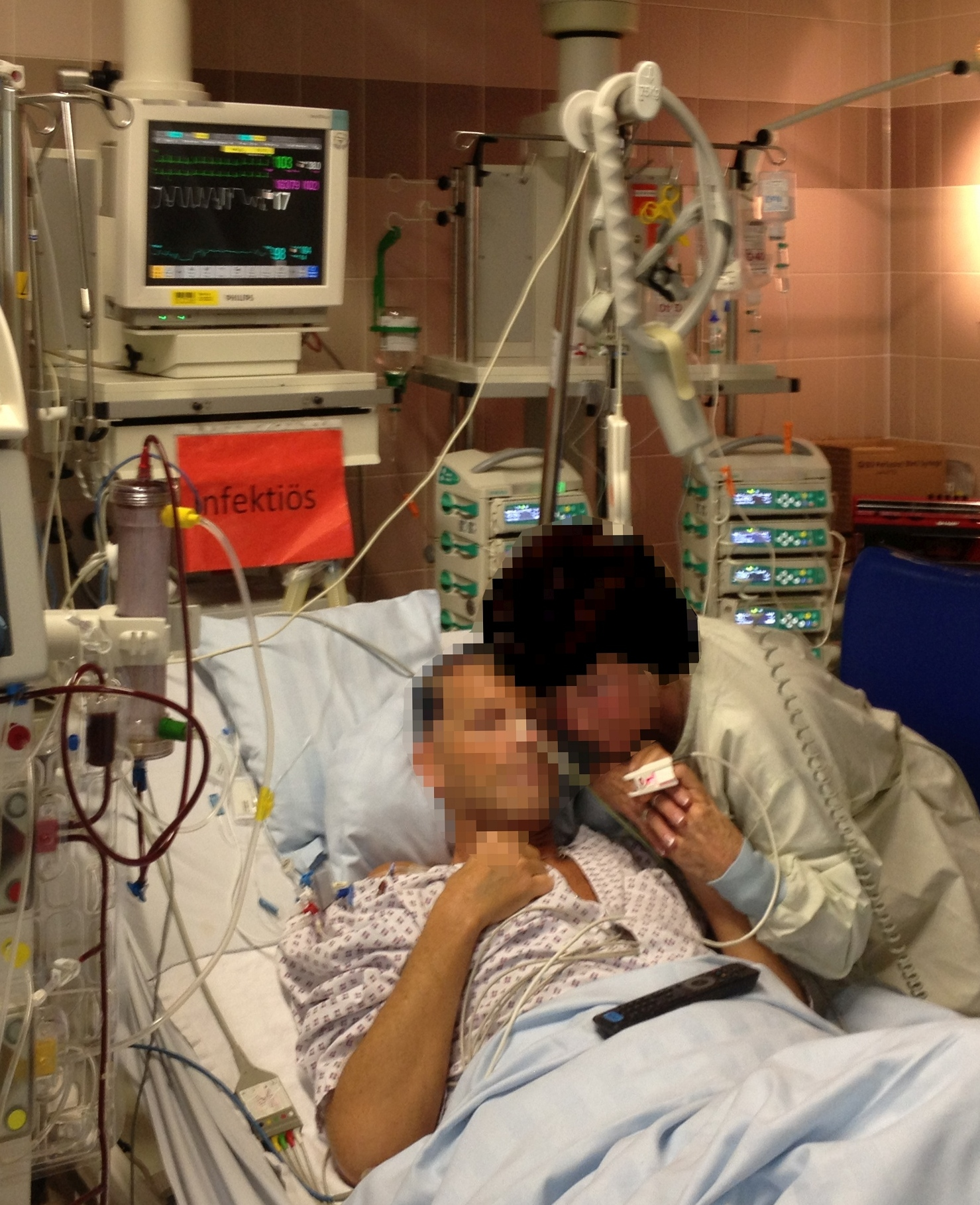
This patient of an intensive care unit of a German hospital could not eat due to a prior surgical operation of the abdominal region which was complicated by a severe sepsis. He received antibiotics, parenteral nutrition and pain killers via automated injection employing syringe drivers (background, right).

Parenteral nutrition is the act of providing required nutrients to a person through an intravenous line. This is used in people who are unable to get nutrients normally, by eating and digesting food. A person receiving parenteral nutrition will be given an intravenous solution which may contain salts, dextrose, amino acids, lipids and vitamins. The exact formulation of a parenteral nutrition used will depend on the specific nutritional needs of the person it is being given to. If a person is only receiving nutrition intravenously, it is called total parenteral nutrition (TPN), whereas if a person is only receiving some of their nutrition intravenously it is called partial parenteral nutrition (or supplemental parenteral nutrition).

==== Imaging ====
Medical imaging relies on being able to clearly distinguish internal parts of the body from each other. One way this is accomplished is through the administration of a contrast agent into a vein. The specific imaging technique being employed will determine the characteristics of an appropriate contrast agent to increase visibility of blood vessels or other features. Common contrast agents are administered into a peripheral vein from which they are distributed throughout the circulation to the imaging site.

=== Other uses ===
==== Use in sports ====
IV rehydration was formerly a common technique for athletes. The World Anti-Doping Agency prohibits intravenous injection of more than 100 mL per 12 hours, except under a medical exemption. The United States Anti-Doping Agency notes that, as well as the dangers inherent in IV therapy, "IVs can be used to change blood test results (such as hematocrit where EPO or blood doping is being used), mask urine test results (by dilution) or by administering prohibited substances in a way that will more quickly be cleared from the body in order to beat an anti-doping test". Players suspended after attending "boutique IV clinics" which offer this sort of treatment include footballer Samir Nasri in 2017 and swimmer Ryan Lochte in 2018.

==== Use for hangover treatment ====
In the 1960s, John Myers developed the "Myers' cocktail", a non-prescription IV solution of vitamins and minerals marketed as a hangover cure and general wellness remedy. The first "boutique IV" clinic, offering similar treatments, opened in Tokyo in 2008. These clinics, whose target market was described by Elle as "health nuts who moonlight as heavy drinkers", have been publicized in the 2010s by glamorous celebrity customers. Intravenous therapy is also used in people with acute ethanol toxicity to correct electrolyte and vitamin deficiencies which arise from alcohol consumption.

==== Others ====
In some countries, non-prescription intravenous glucose is used to improve a person's energy, but is not a part of routine medical care in countries such as the United States where glucose solutions are prescription drugs. Improperly administered intravenous glucose (called "ringer"), such as that which is administered clandestinely in store-front clinics, poses increased risks due to improper technique and oversight. Intravenous access is also sometimes used outside of a medical setting for the self-administration of recreational drugs, such as heroin and fentanyl, cocaine, methamphetamine, DMT, and others.

Intravenous therapy is also used for veterinary patient management.

== Types ==
=== Bolus ===
Some medications can be administered as a bolus dose, which is called an "IV push". A syringe containing the medication is connected to an access port in the primary tubing and the medication is administered through the port. A bolus may be administered rapidly (with a fast depression of the syringe plunger) or may be administered slowly, over the course of a few minutes. The exact administration technique depends on the medication and other factors. In some cases, a bolus of plain IV solution (i.e. without medication added) is administered immediately after the bolus to further force the medicine into the bloodstream. This procedure is termed an "IV flush". Certain medications, such as potassium, are not able to be administered by IV push due to the extremely rapid onset of action and high level of effects.

=== Infusion ===
An infusion of medication may be used when it is desirable to have a constant blood concentration of a medication over time, such as with some antibiotics including beta-lactams. Continuous infusions, where the next infusion is begun immediately following the completion of the prior, may also be used to limit variation in drug concentration in the blood (i.e. between the peak drug levels and the trough drug levels). They may also be used instead of intermittent bolus injections for the same reason, such as with furosemide. Infusions can also be intermittent, in which case the medication is administered over a period of time, then stopped, and this is later repeated. Intermittent infusion may be used when there are concerns about the stability of medicine in solution for long periods of time (as is common with continuous infusions), or to enable the administration of medicines which would be incompatible if administered at the same time in the same IV line, for example vancomycin.

Failure to properly calculate and administer an infusion can result in adverse effects, termed infusion reactions. For this reason, many medications have a maximum recommended infusion rate, such as vancomycin and many monoclonal antibodies. These infusion reactions can be severe, such as in the case of vancomycin, where the reaction is termed "red man syndrome".

=== Secondary ===
Any additional medication to be administered intravenously at the same time as an infusion may be connected to the primary tubing; this is termed a secondary IV, or IV piggyback. This prevents the need for multiple IV access lines on the same person. When administering a secondary IV medication, the primary bag is held lower than the secondary bag so that the secondary medication can flow into the primary tubing, rather than fluid from the primary bag flowing into the secondary tubing. The fluid from the primary bag is needed to help flush any remaining medication from the secondary IV from the tubing. If a bolus or secondary infusion is intended for administration in the same line as a primary infusion, the molecular compatibility of the solutions must be considered. Secondary compatibility is generally referred to as "y-site compatibility", named after the shape of the tubing which has a port for bolus administration. Incompatibility of two fluids or medications can arise due to issues of molecular stability, changes in solubility, or degradation of one of the medications.

== Methods and equipment ==
=== Access ===
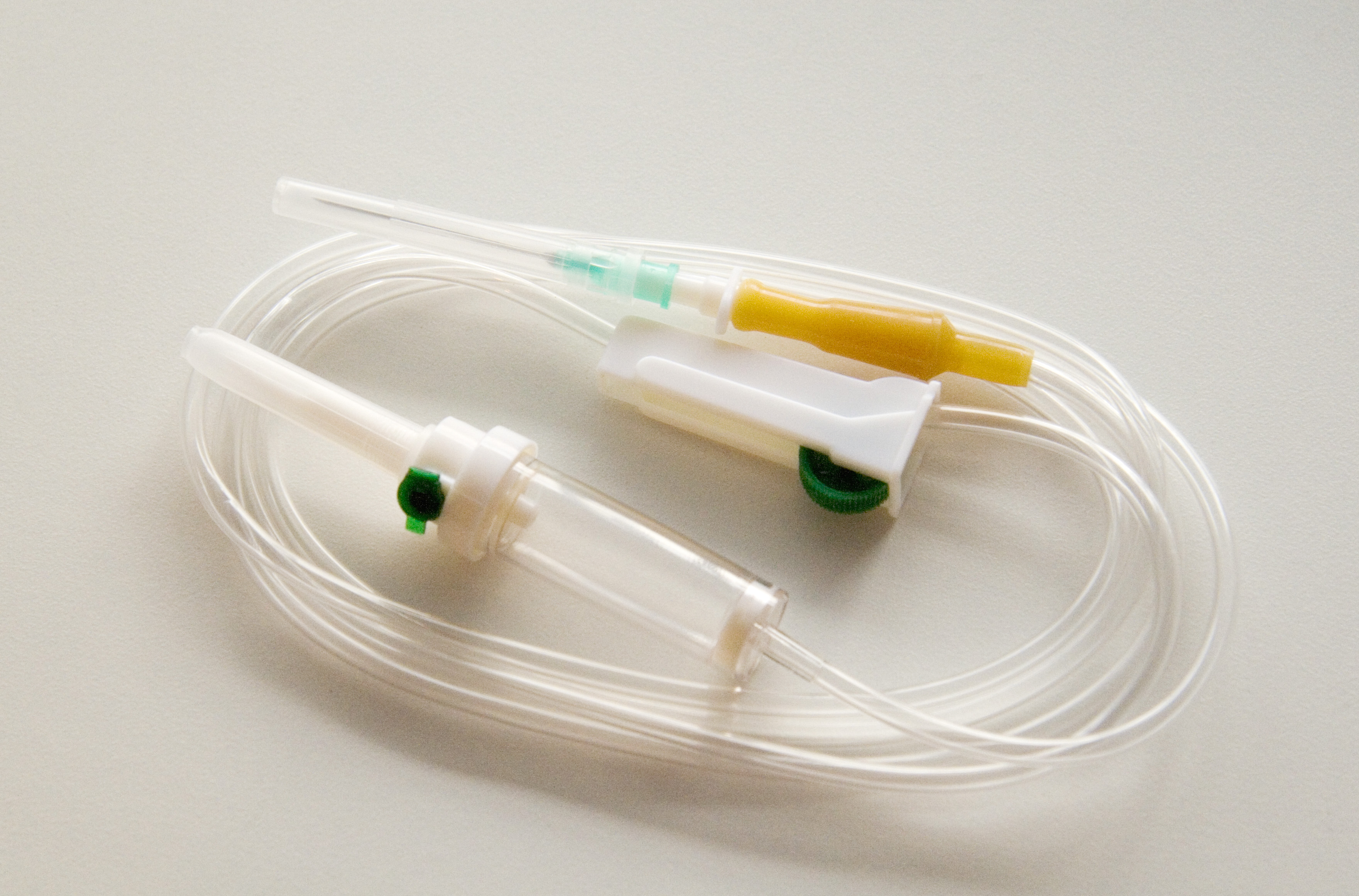
IV infusion set (not yet in use)

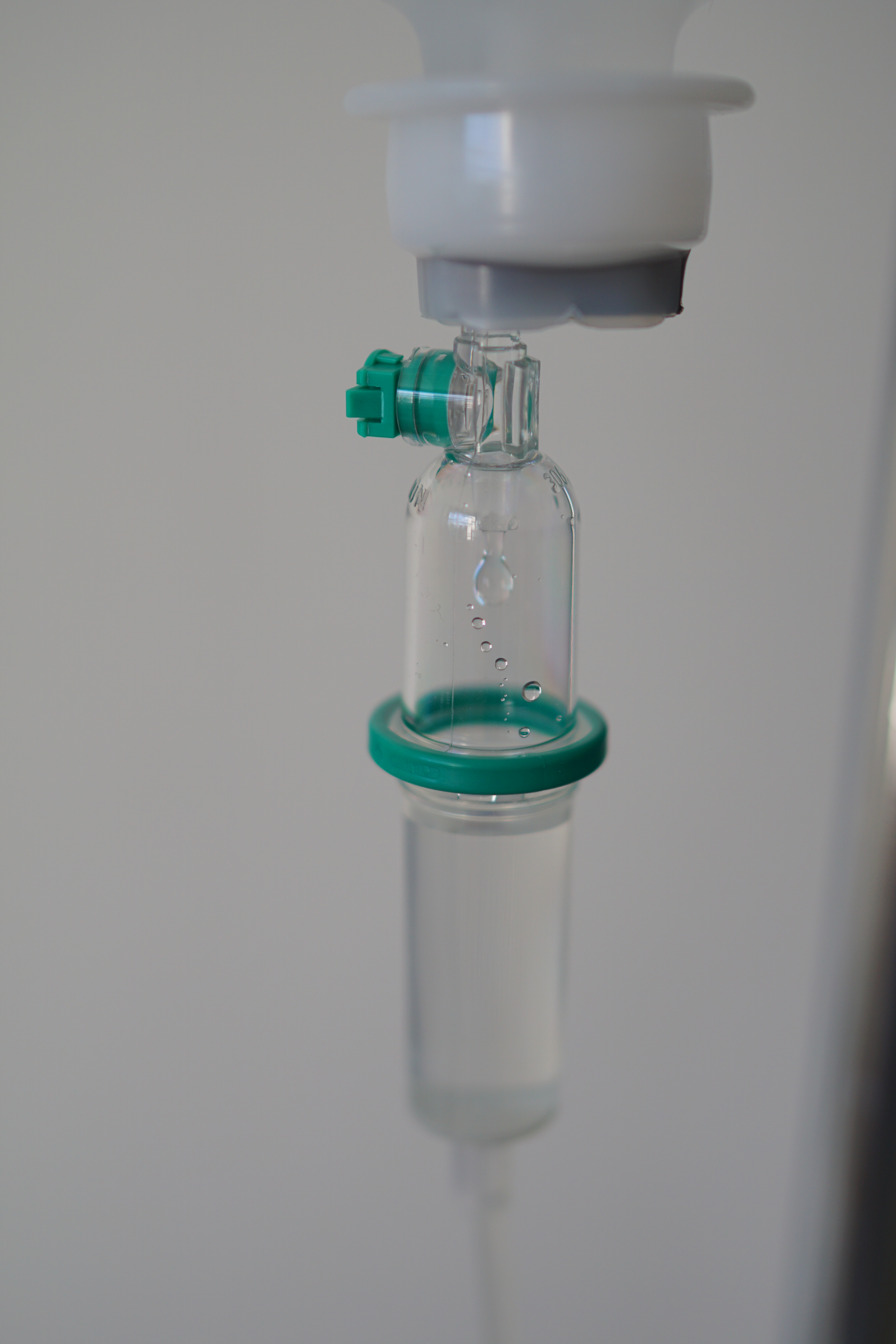
Drip chamber

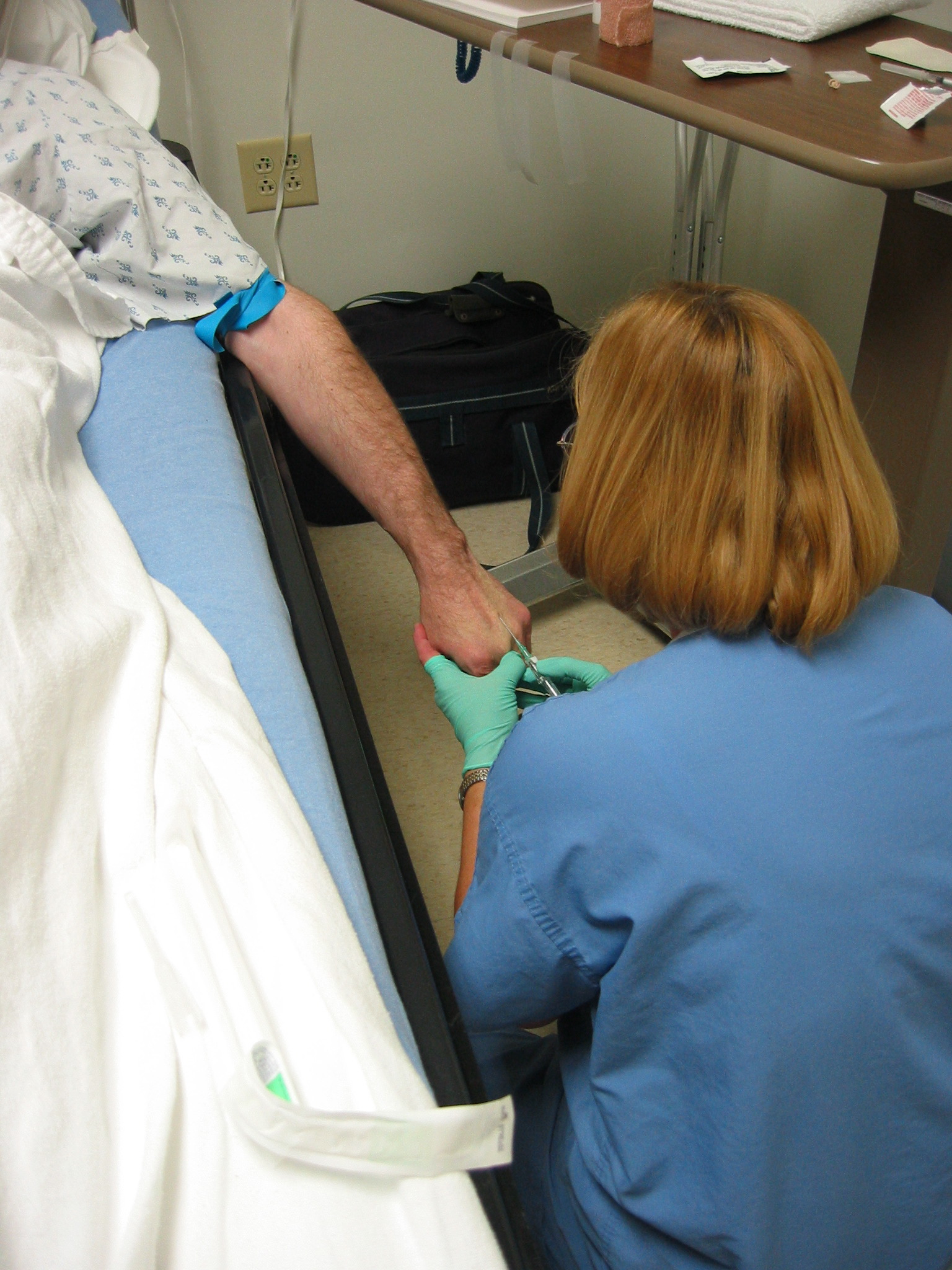
A nurse inserting an 18-gauge IV needle with cannula

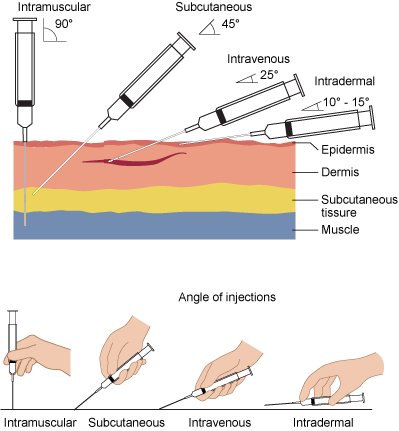
A needle for intravenous access should be inserted at an approximately 25-degree angle.

The simplest form of intravenous access is by passing a hollow needle through the skin directly into a vein. A syringe can be connected directly to this needle, which allows for a "bolus" dose to be administered. Alternatively, the needle may be placed and then connected to a length of tubing, allowing for an infusion to be administered. The type and location of venous access (i.e. a central line versus peripheral line, and in which vein the line is placed) can be affected by the potential for some medications to cause peripheral vasoconstriction, which limits circulation to peripheral veins.

A peripheral cannula is the most common intravenous access method utilized in hospitals, pre-hospital care, and outpatient medicine. This may be placed in the arm, commonly either the wrist or the median cubital vein at the elbow. A tourniquet may be used to restrict the venous drainage of the limb and make the vein bulge, making it easier to locate and place a line in a vein. When used, a tourniquet should be removed before injecting medication to prevent extravasation. The part of the catheter that remains outside the skin is called the connecting hub; it can be connected to a syringe or an intravenous infusion line, or capped with a heplock or saline lock, a needleless connection filled with a small amount of heparin or saline solution to prevent clotting, between uses of the catheter. Ported cannulae have an injection port on the top that is often used to administer medicine.

The thickness and size of needles and catheters can be given in Birmingham gauge or French gauge. A Birmingham gauge of 14 is a very large cannula (used in resuscitation settings) and 24-26 is the smallest. The most common sizes are 16-gauge (midsize line used for blood donation and transfusion), 18- and 20-gauge (all-purpose line for infusions and blood draws), and 22-gauge (all-purpose pediatric line). 12- and 14-gauge peripheral lines are capable of delivering large volumes of fluid very fast, accounting for their popularity in emergency medicine. These lines are frequently called "large bores" or "trauma lines".

==== Peripheral lines ====
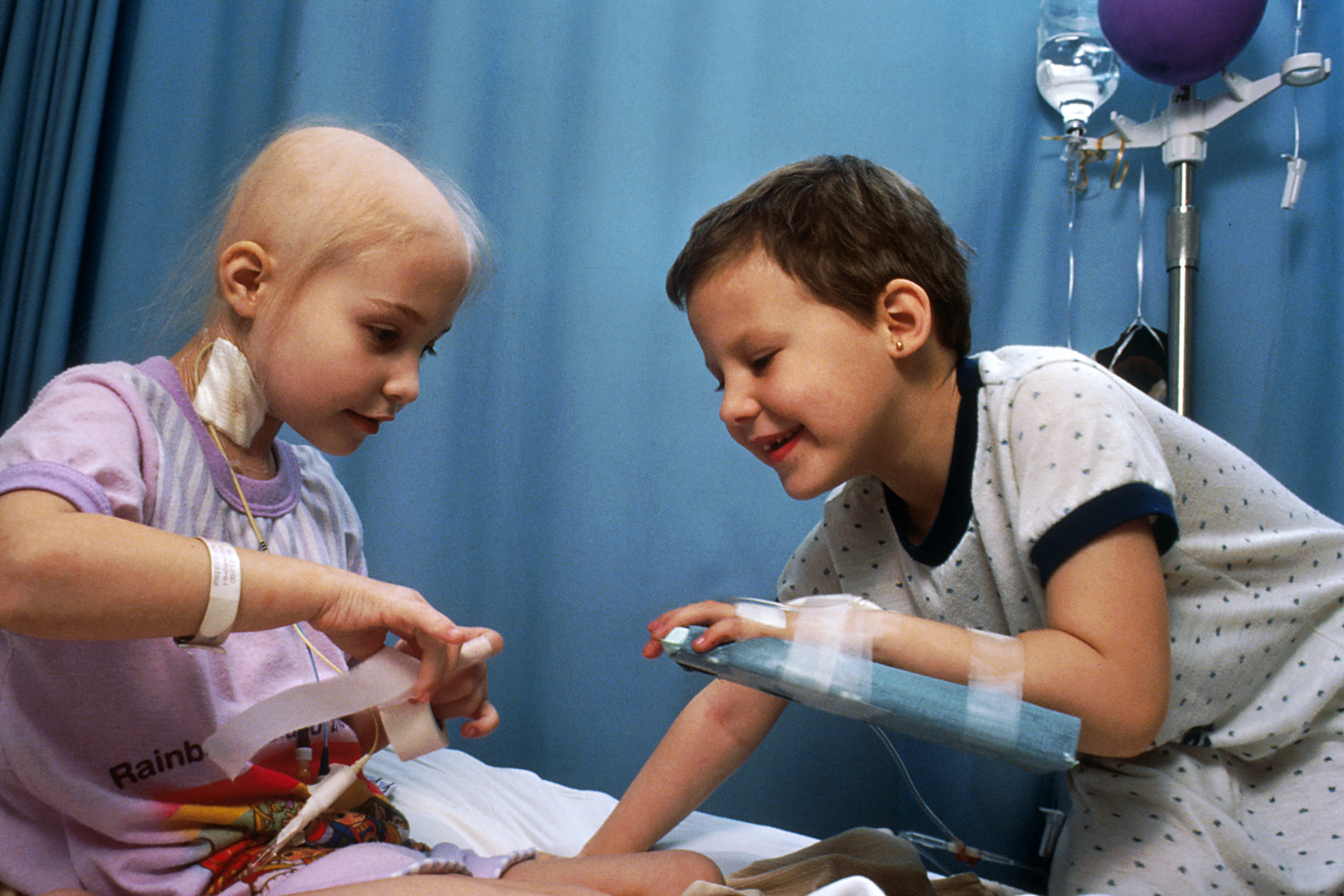
An arm board is recommended for immobilizing the extremity for cannulation of the hand, the foot or the antecubital fossa in children.

A peripheral intravenous line is inserted in peripheral veins, such as the veins in the arms, hands, legs and feet. Medication administered in this way travels through the veins to the heart, from where it is distributed to the rest of the body through the circulatory system. The size of the peripheral vein limits the amount and rate of medication which can be administered safely. A peripheral line consists of a short catheter inserted through the skin into a peripheral vein. This is usually in the form of a cannula-over-needle device, in which a flexible plastic cannula comes mounted over a metal trocar. Once the tip of the needle and cannula are placed, the cannula is advanced inside the vein over the trocar to the appropriate position and secured. The trocar is then withdrawn and discarded. Blood samples may also be drawn from the line directly after the initial IV cannula insertion.

Illustration of a non-tunneled central venous access device

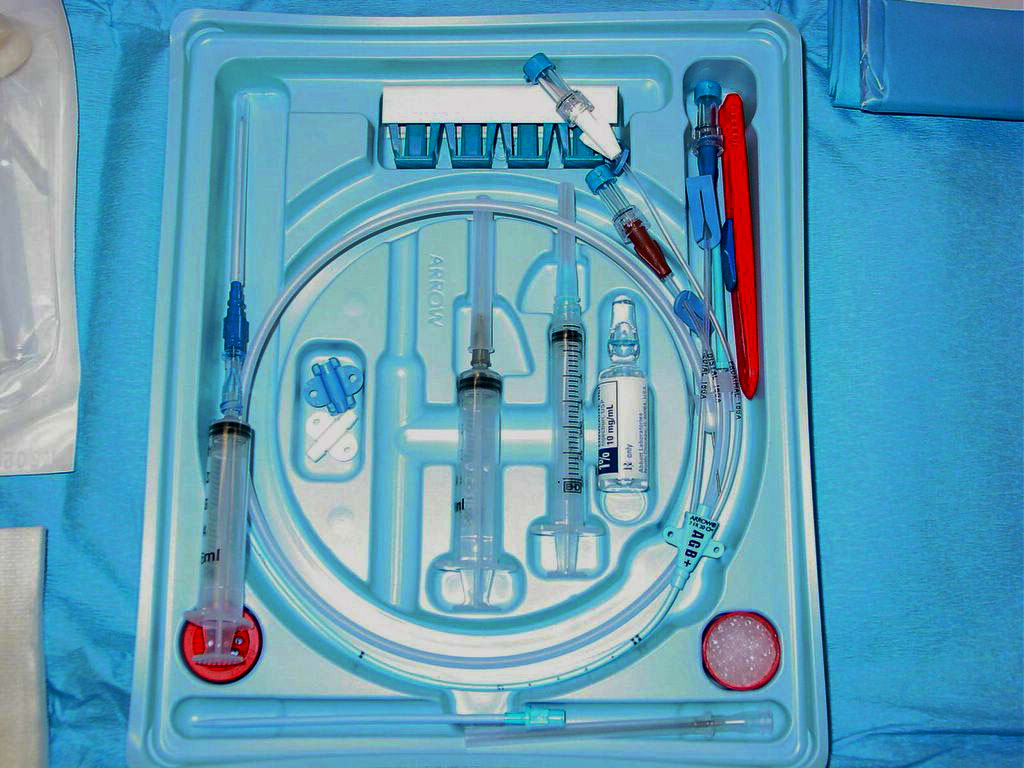
The central line kit (out of its packaging)

==== Central lines ====
A central line is an access method in which a catheter empties into a larger, more central vein (a vein within the torso), usually the superior vena cava, inferior vena cava or the right atrium of the heart. There are several types of central IV access, categorized based on the route the catheter takes from the outside of the body to the central vein output.

==== Peripherally inserted central catheter ====
A peripherally inserted central catheter (also called a PICC line) is a type of central IV access which consists of a cannula inserted through a sheath into a peripheral vein and then carefully fed towards the heart, terminating at the superior vena cava or the right atrium. These lines are usually placed in peripheral veins in the arm, and may be placed using the Seldinger technique under ultrasound guidance. An X-ray is used to verify that the end of the cannula is in the right place if fluoroscopy was not used during the insertion. An EKG can also be used in some cases to determine if the end of the cannula is in the correct location.

==== Tunneled lines ====
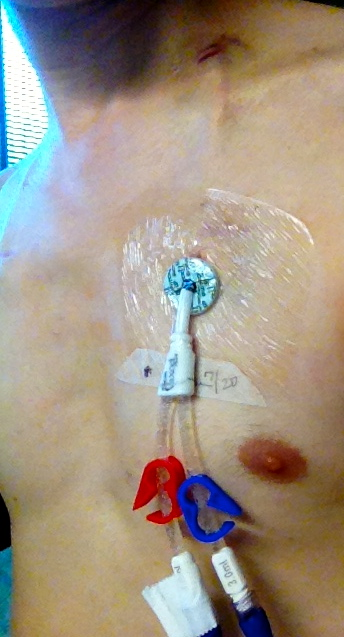
A Hickman line, a type of tunneled catheter, inserted through the skin at the chest and tunneled to insert into the jugular vein in the throat

A tunneled line is a type of central access which is inserted under the skin, and then travels a significant distance through surrounding tissue before reaching and penetrating the central vein. Using a tunneled line reduces the risk of infection as compared to other forms of access, as bacteria from the skin surface are not able to travel directly into the vein. These catheters are often made of materials that resist infection and clotting. Types of tunneled central lines include the Hickman line or Broviac catheter. A tunnelled line is an option for long term venous access necessary for hemodialysis in people with poor kidney function.

==== Implantable ports ====
An implanted port is a central line that does not have an external connector protruding from the skin for administration of medication. Instead, a port consists of a small reservoir covered with silicone rubber which is implanted under the skin, which then covers the reservoir. Medication is administered by injecting medication through the skin and the silicone port cover into the reservoir. When the needle is withdrawn, the reservoir cover reseals itself. A port cover is designed to function for hundreds of needle sticks during its lifetime. Ports may be placed in an arm or in the chest area.

=== Infusions ===
Equipment used to place and administer an IV line for infusion consists of a bag, usually hanging above the height of the person, and sterile tubing through which the medicine is administered. In a basic "gravity" IV, a bag is simply hung above the height of the person and the solution is pulled via gravity through a tube attached to a needle inserted into a vein. Without extra equipment, it is not possible to precisely control the rate of administration. For this reason, a setup may also incorporate a clamp to regulate flow. Some IV lines may be placed with "Y-sites", devices which enable a secondary solution to be administered through the same line (known as piggybacking). Some systems employ a drip chamber, which prevents air from entering the bloodstream (causing an air embolism), and allows visual estimation of flow rate of the solution.

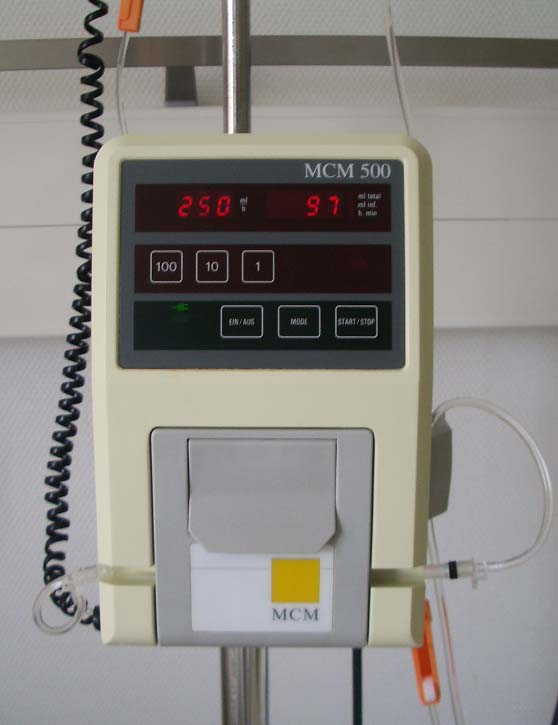
An infusion pump suitable for a single IV line

Alternatively, an infusion pump allows precise control over the flow rate and total amount delivered. A pump is programmed based on the number and size of infusions being administered to ensure all medicine is fully administered without allowing the access line to run dry. Pumps are primarily utilized when a constant flow rate is important, or where changes in rate of administration would have consequences.

=== Techniques ===
To reduce pain associated with the procedure, medical staff may apply a topical local anaesthetic (such as EMLA or Ametop) to the skin of the chosen venipuncture area about 45 minutes beforehand.

If the cannula is not inserted correctly, or the vein is particularly fragile and ruptures, blood may extravasate into the surrounding tissues; this situation is known as a blown vein or "tissuing". Using this cannula to administer medications causes extravasation of the drug, which can lead to edema, causing pain and tissue damage, and even necrosis depending on the medication. The person attempting to obtain the access must find a new access site proximal to the "blown" area to prevent extravasation of medications through the damaged vein. For this reason it is advisable to site the first cannula at the most distal appropriate vein.

== Adverse effects ==
=== Pain ===
Placement of an intravenous line inherently causes pain when the skin is broken and is considered medically invasive. For this reason, when other forms of administration may suffice, intravenous therapy is usually not preferred. This includes the treatment of mild or moderate dehydration with oral rehydration therapy which is an option, as opposed to parenteral rehydration through an IV line. Children in emergency departments being treated for dehydration have better outcomes with oral treatment than intravenous therapy due to the pain and complications of an intravenous line. Cold spray may decrease the pain of putting in an IV.

Certain medications also have specific sensations of pain associated with their administration IV. This includes potassium, which when administered IV can cause a burning or painful sensation. The incidence of side effects specific to a medication can be affected by the type of access (peripheral versus central), the rate of administration, or the quantity of drug administered. When medications are administered too rapidly through an IV line, a set of vague symptoms such as redness or rash, fever, and others may occur; this is termed an "infusion reaction" and is prevented by decreasing the rate of administration of the medication. When vancomycin is involved, this is commonly termed "Red Man syndrome" after the rapid flushing which occurs after rapid administration.

=== Infection and inflammation ===
As placement of an intravenous line requires breaking the skin, there is a risk of infection. Skin-dwelling organisms such as coagulase-negative staphylococcus or Candida albicans may enter through the insertion site around the catheter, or bacteria may be accidentally introduced inside the catheter from contaminated equipment. Infection of an IV access site is usually local, causing easily visible swelling, redness, and fever. However, pathogens may also enter the bloodstream, causing sepsis, which can be sudden and life-threatening. A central IV line poses a higher risk of sepsis, as it can deliver bacteria directly into the central circulation. A line which has been in place for a longer period of time also increases the risk of infection.

Inflammation of the vein may also occur, called thrombophlebitis or simply phlebitis. This may be caused by infection, the catheter itself, or the specific fluids or medication being given. Repeated instances of phlebitis can cause scar tissue to build up along a vein. A peripheral IV line cannot be left in the vein indefinitely out of concern for the risk of infection and phlebitis, among other potential complications. However, recent studies have found that there is no increased risk of complications in those whose IVs were replaced only when clinically indicated versus those whose IVs were replaced routinely. If placed with proper aseptic technique, it is not recommended to change a peripheral IV line more frequently than every 72–96 hours.

Phlebitis is particularly common in intravenous drug users, and those undergoing chemotherapy, whose veins can become sclerotic and difficult to access over time, sometimes forming a hard, painful "venous cord". The presence of a cord is a cause of discomfort and pain associated with IV therapy, and makes it more difficult for an IV line to be placed as a line cannot be placed in an area with a cord.

=== Infiltration and extravasation ===
Infiltration occurs when a non-vesicant IV fluid or medication enters the surrounding tissue as opposed to the desired vein. It may occur when the vein itself ruptures, when the vein is damaged during insertion of the intravascular access device, or from increased vein porosity. Infiltration may also occur if the puncture of the vein by the needle becomes the path of least resistance—such as a cannula which has been left inserted, causing the vein to scar. It can also occur upon insertion of an IV line if a tourniquet is not promptly removed. Infiltration is characterized by coolness and pallor to the skin as well as localized swelling or edema. It is treated by removing the intravenous line and elevating the affected limb so the collected fluids drain away. Injections of hyaluronidase around the area can be used to speed the dispersal of the fluid/drug. Infiltration is one of the most common adverse effects of IV therapy and is usually not serious unless the infiltrated fluid is a medication damaging to the surrounding tissue, most commonly a vesicant or chemotherapeutic agent. In such cases, the infiltration is termed extravasation, and may cause necrosis.

=== Others ===
If the solutions administered are colder than the temperature of the body, induced hypothermia can occur. If the temperature change to the heart is rapid, ventricular fibrillation may result. Furthermore, if a solution which is not balanced in concentration is administered, a person's electrolytes may become imbalanced. In hospitals, regular blood tests may be used to proactively monitor electrolyte levels.

Management and prevention of the intravenous therapy complications

If you notice any of these complications, healthcare professionals typically stop the infusion and remove the catheter immediately. You can prevent many of these risks by doing the following:

- Perform strict hand hygiene and use aseptic technique during insertion.
- Stabilize the IV catheter carefully to prevent any mechanical friction.
- Use the smallest gauge catheter possible to deliver the required fluids.
- Monitor IV sites regularly for redness, swelling, or patient discomfort.

== History ==
=== Discovery and development ===
The first recorded attempt at administering a therapeutic substance via IV injection was in 1492, when Pope Innocent VIII fell ill and was administered blood from healthy individuals. If this occurred, the treatment did not work and resulted in the death of the donors while not healing the pope. This story is disputed by some, who claim that the idea of blood transfusions could not have been considered by the medical professionals at the time, or that a complete description of blood circulation was not published until over 100 years later. The story is attributed to potential errors in translation of documents from the time, as well as potentially an intentional fabrication, whereas others still consider it to be accurate. One of the leading medical history textbooks for medical and nursing students has claimed that the entire story was an anti-semitic fabrication.

In 1656 Sir Christopher Wren and Robert Boyle worked on the subject. As stated by Wren, "I Have Injected Wine and Ale in a liveing Dog into the Mass of Blood by a Veine, in good Quantities, till I have made him extremely drunk, but soon after he Pisseth it out." The dog survived, grew fat, and was later stolen from his owner. Boyle attributed authorship to Wren.

Richard Lower showed it was possible for blood to be transfused from animal to animal and from animal to man intravenously, a xenotransfusion. He worked with Edmund King to transfuse sheep's blood into a man who was mentally ill. Lower was interested in advancing science but also believed the man could be helped, either by the infusion of fresh blood or by the removal of old blood. It was difficult to find people who would agree to be transfused, but an eccentric scholar, Arthur Coga, consented and the procedure was carried out by Lower and King before the Royal Society on 23 November 1667. Transfusion gathered some popularity in France and Italy, but medical and theological debates arose, resulting in transfusion being prohibited in France.

There was virtually no recorded success with any attempts at injection therapy until the 1800s, when in 1831 Thomas Latta studied the use of IV fluid replacements for cholera treatment. The first solutions which saw widespread use for IV injections were simple "saline-like solutions", which were followed by experiments with various other liquids, including milk, sugar, honey, and egg yolk.

In the 1830s, James Blundell, an English obstetrician, used intravenous administration of blood to treat women bleeding profusely during or after delivery. This predated the understanding of blood type, leading to unpredictable results.

=== Modern usage ===
Intravenous therapy was expanded by Italian physician Guido Baccelli in the late 1890s and further developed in the 1930s by Samuel Hirschfeld, Harold T. Hyman and Justine Johnstone Wanger but was not widely available until the 1950s. There was a time, roughly the 1910s–1920s, when fluid replacement that today would be done intravenously was likelier to be done with a Murphy drip, a rectal infusion; and IV therapy took years to increasingly displace that route. In the 1960s, the concept of providing a person's complete nutritional needs through an IV solution began to be seriously considered. The first parenteral nutrition supplementation consisted of hydrolyzed proteins and dextrose. This was followed in 1975 with the introduction of intravenous fat emulsions and vitamins which were added to form "total parenteral nutrition", or that which includes protein, fat, and carbohydrates.

== See also ==
- Banana bag
- Dialysis
- Fluid warmer
- Hypodermic needle
- Life support
- Needleless connector
- Rehydrex
- Saline flush
