= Volume expander =

Intravenous fluid that increases body fluid volume

A volume expander is a type of intravenous therapy that has the function of providing volume for the circulatory system. It may be used for fluid replacement or during surgery to prevent nausea and vomiting after surgery.

== Physiology ==
When blood is lost, the greatest immediate need is to stop further blood loss. The second greatest need is replacing the lost volume. This way remaining red blood cells can still oxygenate body tissue. Normal human blood has a significant excess oxygen transport capability, only used in cases of great physical exertion. Provided blood volume is maintained by volume expanders, a rested patient can safely tolerate very low hemoglobin levels, less than 1/3 that of a healthy person.

The body detects the lower hemoglobin level, and compensatory mechanisms start up. The heart pumps more blood with each beat. Since the lost blood was replaced with a suitable fluid, the now diluted blood flows more easily, even in the small vessels. As a result of chemical changes, more oxygen is released to the tissues. These adaptations are so effective that if only half of the red blood cells remain, oxygen delivery may still be about 75 percent of normal. A patient at rest uses only 25 percent of the oxygen available in their blood. In extreme cases, patients have survived with a hemoglobin level of 2 g/dl, about 1/7 the normal, although levels this low are very dangerous.

With enough blood loss, ultimately red blood cell levels drop too low for adequate tissue oxygenation, even if volume expanders maintain circulatory volume. In these situations, the only alternatives are blood transfusions, packed red blood cells, or oxygen therapeutics (if available). However, in some circumstances, hyperbaric oxygen therapy can maintain adequate tissue oxygenation even if red blood cell levels are below normal life-sustaining levels.

== Types ==
There are two main types of volume expanders: crystalloids and colloids. Crystalloids are aqueous solutions of mineral salts or other water-soluble molecules. Colloids contain larger insoluble molecules, such as gelatin; blood itself is a colloid. There is no evidence that colloids are better than crystalloids in those who have had trauma, burns, or surgery. Colloids are more expensive than crystalloids. As such, colloids are not recommended for volume expansion in these settings.

=== Crystalloids ===
The most commonly used crystalloid fluid is normal saline, a solution of sodium chloride at 0.9% concentration, which is close to the concentration in the blood (isotonic). Ringer's lactate or Ringer's acetate is another isotonic solution often used for large-volume fluid replacement. The choice of fluids may also depend on the chemical properties of the medications being given.

==== Normal saline ====
Normal saline (NS) is the commonly used term for a solution of 0.9% w/v of NaCl, about 300 mOsm/L. Less commonly, this solution is referred to as physiological saline or isotonic saline, neither of which is technically accurate. NS is used frequently in intravenous drips (IVs) for patients who cannot take fluids orally and have developed or are in danger of developing dehydration or hypovolemia. NS is typically the first fluid used when hypovolemia is severe enough to threaten the adequacy of blood circulation, and has long been believed to be the safest fluid to give quickly in large volumes. However, it is now known that rapid infusion of NS can cause metabolic acidosis.

==== Ringer's solution ====
Lactated Ringer's solution contains 28 mmol/L lactate, 4 mmol/L K^{+} and 1.5 mmol/L Ca^{2+}. It is very similar – though not identical – to Hartmann's solution, the ionic concentrations of which differ slightly. Ringer's lactate contains calcium, which may combine with citrate (that is used as a preservative in some blood products) and form a precipitate; therefore, it is not to be used as a diluent in blood transfusions.

==== 1/3 NS 2/3D5 ====
2/3 1/3 is no longer recommended as a maintenance intravenous fluid in children as it is hypotonic and isotonic fluids are preferred.

==== Glucose (dextrose) ====
Intravenous sugar solutions, such as those containing glucose (also called dextrose), have the advantage of providing some energy, and may thereby provide the entire or part of the energy component of parenteral nutrition.

Types of glucose/dextrose include:

- D5W (5% dextrose in water), which consists of 278 mmol/L dextrose
- D5NS (5% dextrose in normal saline), which, in addition, contains normal saline.

==== Plasma-lyte ====
Plasma-Lyte A and Plasma-Lyte 148 are buffered crystalloid solutions that may be infused intravenously, or used in conjunction with blood products.

==== Comparison table ====
Composition of common crystalloid solutions
Solution	Other Name	[Na^{+}](mmol/L)	[Cl^{−}](mmol/L)	[Glucose](mmol/L)	[Glucose](mg/dl)
D5W	5% Dextrose	0	0	278	5000
2/3 D5W & 1/3 NS	3.3% Dextrose / 0.3% saline	51	51	185	3333
Half-normal saline	0.45% NaCl	77	77	0	0
Normal saline	0.9% NaCl	154	154	0	0
Ringer's lactate	Lactated Ringer	130	109	0	0
D5NS	5% Dextrose, Normal Saline	154	154	278	5000

Effect of adding one litre
Solution	Change in ECF	Change in ICF
D5W	333 mL	667 mL
2/3 D5W & 1/3 NS	556 mL	444 mL
Half-normal saline	667 mL	333 mL
Normal saline	1000 mL	0 mL
Ringer's lactate	900 mL	100 mL

=== Colloids ===
Colloids preserve a high colloid osmotic pressure in the blood, while, on the other hand, this parameter is decreased by crystalloids due to hemodilution. Therefore, they should theoretically preferentially increase the intravascular volume, whereas crystalloids also increase the interstitial volume and intracellular volume. However, there is no evidence to support that this results in less mortality than crystalloids. Another difference is that crystalloids generally are much cheaper than colloids. Common colloids used in the medical context include albumin and fresh frozen plasma.

==== Hydroxyethyl starch ====
Hydroxyethyl starch (HES/HAES, common trade names: Hespan, Voluven) is controversial. Its use in those who are very ill is associated with an increased risk of death and kidney problems. Therefore, HES/HAES is not recommended in people with known inflammatory conditions such as renal impairment.

==== Gelofusine ====
Gelofusine is a colloid volume expander which may be used as a blood plasma replacement when a significant amount of blood is lost due to extreme hemorrhagia, trauma, dehydration, or a similar event. It is an intravenous colloid that behaves much like blood filled with albumins. As a result, it causes an increase in blood volume, blood flow, cardiac output, and oxygen transportation.
