= Single unit transfusion =

Type of blood transfusion

Single unit transfusion refers to transfusing a single unit or bag of blood product to a person who is not bleeding and haemodynamically stable followed by an assessment to see if further transfusion is required.. The benefits of single unit transfusion include reduced exposure to blood products. Each unit transfused increases the associated risks of transfusion such as infection, transfusion associated circulatory overload and other side effects. Transfusion of a single unit also encourages less wastage of blood products and can be cost-effective. Single unit transfusion can be as part of an institutional or national guidelines and instituted with the help of a transfusion committee or transfusion practitioner. Education of medical staff is important and catch phrases such as "Why use two when one will do", "every ONE matters" or "one bag is best - then reassess" have been used.

== Red blood cells ==
Following one bag of red blood cells, symptom relief is assessed in terms of shortness of breath, chest pain and tiredness. A post transfusion full blood count could be undertaken to assess for the rise in hemoglobin.

== Plasma ==
Transfusion of fresh frozen plasma aims to replace of clotting factors. Single unit transfusion also applies to transfusion of fresh frozen plasma in that there should be a clinical indication for the number transfused. Coagulation studies and point of care whole blood functional assays such as TEG or ROTEM can be used to assess whether further units are required.

== Platelets ==
The single unit policy is helpful in platelet transfusion as there this blood component has a shorter shelf-life than other components. Assessment after one bag can include assessing clinical bleeding, platelet count looking at the post transfusion increment and/or functional platelet assessments.
