= Whole blood =

Unseparated human blood

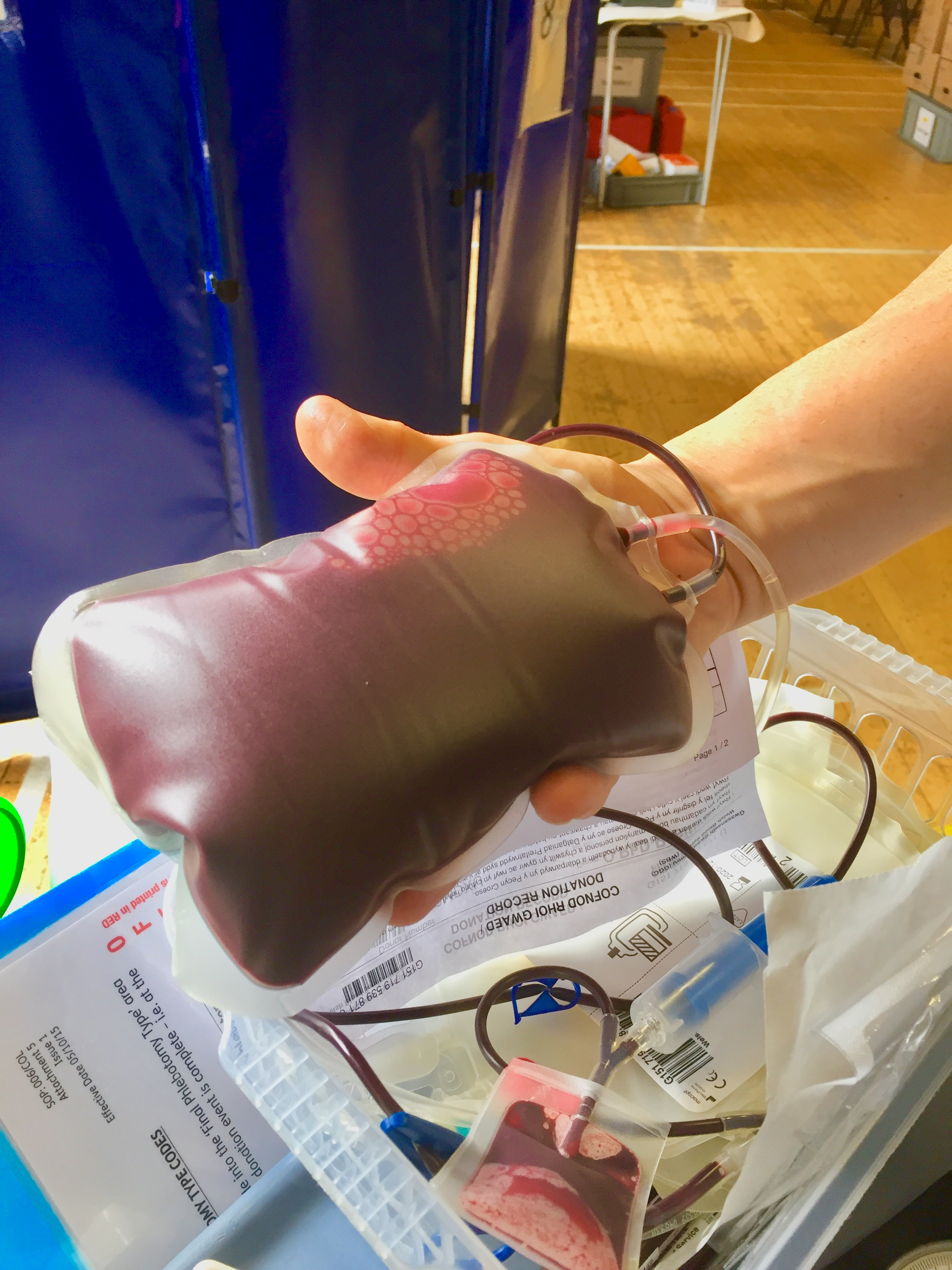
- A whole blood donation

Clinical data
- Routes of administration: I.V., I.O.
- ATC code: B05A (WHO)

Identifiers
- ChemSpider: none

Whole blood (WB) is human blood from a standard blood donation. It is used in the treatment of hemorrhagic shock, in exchange transfusion, and when people donate blood to themselves (autologous transfusion). One unit of whole blood (approximately 450 mL) increases hemoglobin levels by about 10 g/L. Cross matching is typically done before the blood is given. It is either given intravenously or through Intraosseous infusion.

Side effects include red blood cell breakdown, high blood potassium, infection, volume overload, lung injury, and allergic reactions such as anaphylaxis. Whole blood is made up of red blood cells, white blood cells, platelets, and blood plasma. It is best within a day of collection; however, it can be stored for up to three weeks if refrigerated (1-6 °C). The blood is typically combined with an anticoagulant and preservative during the collection process.

The first transfusion of whole blood was in 1818; however, common use did not begin until the First and Second World Wars. It is on the World Health Organization's List of Essential Medicines. Whole blood is also used to make a number of blood products including red cell concentrates, platelet concentrates, cryoprecipitate, and fresh frozen plasma.

== Medical use ==
Whole blood has similar risks to a transfusion of red blood cells and is typically cross-matched to avoid hemolytic transfusion reactions. The use of whole blood is common in low- and middle-income countries. Over 40% of blood collected in low-income countries is administered as whole blood, and approximately a third of all blood collected in middle-income countries is administered as whole blood. Practical guidance and a framework for reintroducution of whole blood transfusion in high-income countries have also been developed.

Whole blood is sometimes "recreated" from stored red blood cells and fresh frozen plasma (FFP) for neonatal transfusions. This is done to provide a final product with a very specific hematocrit (percentage of red cells) with type O red cells and type AB plasma to minimize the chance of complications.

Transfusion of whole blood is being used in the military setting and in the civilian setting, where it is being used in pre-hospital trauma care and in the setting of massive transfusion in the civilian setting. Whole blood can be ABO-type specific when the recipient blood type is known. When the recipient's blood group is not known, particularly in pre-hospital transfusion, low-titer O universal donor whole blood (LTOWB) can be used; this requires that the donor plasma contains only low titers of anti-A and anti-B.

== Processing ==
Historically, blood was transfused as whole blood without further processing. Most blood banks now split the whole blood into two or more components, typically red blood cells and a plasma component such as fresh frozen plasma. Platelets for transfusion can also be prepared from a unit of whole blood, whereby 4 or 5 buffy coats are pooled to produce a platelet component. Some blood banks have replaced this with platelets collected by plateletpheresis because whole blood platelets, sometimes called "random donor" platelets, must be pooled from multiple donors to get enough for an adult therapeutic dose.

The collected blood is generally separated into components by one of three methods. A centrifuge can be used in a "hard spin" which separates whole blood into plasma and red cells or a "soft spin" which separates it into plasma, buffy coat (used to make platelets), and red blood cells. The third method is sedimentation: the blood simply sits overnight, and the red cells and plasma are separated by gravitational interactions, which is used predominantly in low-income countries.

== Storage ==
Whole blood is typically stored under the same conditions as red blood cells and can be kept up to 35 days if collected with citrate-phosphate-dextrose-adenine-1 (CPDA-1) anticoagulant solution, or 21 days with other common anticoagulants such as citrate-phosphate-dextrose (CPD).

If the whole blood is used to make platelets, it is kept at room temperature until the process is complete. Whole blood processing must be completed within 24 hours to minimize the warm storage of red cells in the unit.
