= Intraoperative blood salvage =

Type of autologous blood transfusion

- ICD-9: 99.00
- MeSH: D057725

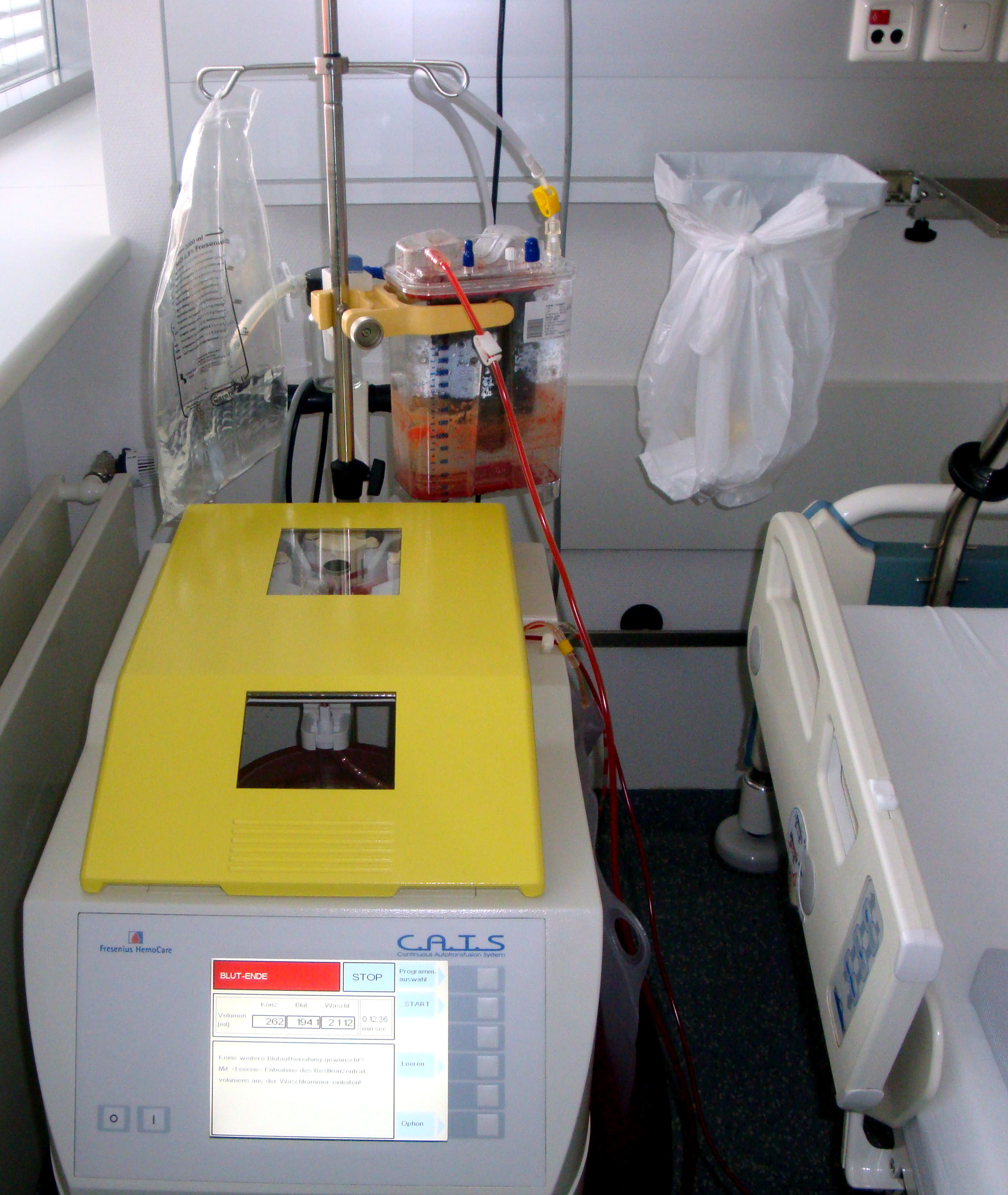
Transfusion equipment

Intraoperative blood salvage (IOS), also known as cell salvage, is a specific type of autologous blood transfusion. Specifically IOS is a medical procedure involving recovering blood lost during surgery and re-infusing it into the patient. It is a major form of autotransfusion.

It has been used for many years and gained greater attention over time as risks associated with allogenic (separate-donor) blood transfusion have seen greater publicity and become more fully appreciated. Several medical devices have been developed to assist in salvaging the patient's own blood in the perioperative setting. The procedure is frequently used in cardiothoracic and vascular surgery, during which blood usage has traditionally been high. A greater effort to avoid adverse events due to transfusion has also increased the emphasis on blood conservation (see bloodless surgery).

== Background ==
Providing safe blood for transfusion remains a challenge despite advances in preventing transmission of hepatitis B virus (HBV), hepatitis C virus (HCV), AIDS/HIV, HTLV-I/II, West Nile virus (WNV), syphilis, Chagas disease, Zika virus, and transfusion-transmitted bacterial infection. Human errors such as misidentifying patients and drawing blood samples from the wrong person (i.e., wrong blood in tube or WBIT) is more of a risk than transmissible diseases in many developed nations.

Much more common risks of allogeneic transfusion include allergic transfusion reactions as well as febrile non-hemolytic transfusion reactions. Additional risks include transfusion related acute lung injury (TRALI), transfusion associated circulatory overload (TACO) and transfusion-associated immunomodulation. TRALI is a potentially life-threatening condition with symptoms such as dyspnea, fever, and hypotension occurring within hours of transfusion. TACO is a much more common (even with cases being underreported) potentially life-threatening condition involving respiratory compromise within hours of a transfusion. TACO must be suspected when there is respiratory distress with other signs, including pulmonary edema, unanticipated cardiovascular system changes, and evidence of fluid overload (including improvement after diuresis), during or up to 24 hours after transfusion. Transfusion-associated immunomodulation, which may suppress the immune response and cause adverse effects such as a small increase in the risk of postoperative infection.

Other risks such as classic or variant Creutzfeldt–Jakob disease (vCJD), an invariably fatal disease, remain worrisome as there are currently no approved tests for which to screen blood donors for this disease. Blood centers worldwide have instituted criteria to reject donors who may have been exposed to classic CJD and vCJD. Screening for transmissible diseases and deferral policies for classic CJD and vCJD designed to improve safety have unfortunately contributed to shrinking the donor pool. Blood shortages exist in the United States and worldwide. In many industrialized countries 5% or less of the eligible population are blood donors.

As a result, some in the global medical community have moved from allogeneic blood (blood collected from another person) towards autologous transfusion, in which patients receive their own blood. Another impetus for autologous transfusion is the position of Jehovah's Witnesses on blood transfusions. For religious reasons, Jehovah's Witnesses may choose not to accept any allogeneic transfusions from a volunteer's blood donation but may accept the use of autologous blood salvaged during surgery to restore their blood volume and homeostasis during the course of an operation, although not autologous blood donated beforehand. Each Jehovah's Witness patient must be individually counselled as to all the possible blood products that are available as they may choose to accept some and not others (i.e., while not accepting whole blood nor any of the four main components of blood, [plasma; platelets; red cells; white cells] some may accept fractions derived from those components, or medications containing such minor fractions); it is an individual choice for each patient. There are other religious/ non-religious individuals besides Jehovah's Witnesses that would refuse allogeneic blood products but may choose to accept intraoperative blood salvage.

== Bloodless options ==
Ways to avoid the adverse events associated with allogenic transfusion are often grouped under the umbrella phrase bloodless surgery. There are several so-called bloodless options. These include:

- Minimally invasive surgical techniques
- Erythropoietin (a hormone that stimulates peripheral stem cells in the bone marrow to produce red blood cells)
- Blood salvage procedures
- Blood substitutes such as blood volume expanders and oxygen carriers (the latter as yet unlicensed in North America)

== Blood salvage procedures ==
=== Cell processing ===
Regardless of manufacturer, there are many types of cell processors. Cell processors are red cell washing devices that collect anticoagulated shed or recovered blood, wash and separate the red blood cells (RBC) by centrifugation or filtration such as the HemoClear filter. After, the washed RBCs can be returned to the same patient by reinfusion. RBC washing devices can help remove byproducts in salvaged blood such as activated cytokines, anaphylatoxins, and other waste substances that may have been collected in the reservoir suctioned from the surgical field. However, they also remove viable platelets, clotting factors, and other plasma proteins essential to whole blood and homeostasis. The various RBC-savers also yield RBC concentrates with different characteristics and quality.

=== Direct transfusion ===
Direct transfusion is a blood salvaging method associated with cardiopulmonary bypass (CPB) circuits or other extracorporeal circuits (ECC) that are used in surgery such as coronary artery bypass grafts (CABG), valve replacement, or surgical repair of the great vessels. Following bypass surgery, the ECC circuit contains a significant volume of diluted whole blood that can be harvested in transfer bags and re-infused into patients. Residual CPB blood is fairly dilute ([Hb] = 6–9 g/dL; 60–90 g/L) compared to normal values (12–18 g/dL; 120–180 g/L) and can also contain potentially harmful contaminants such as activated cytokines, anaphylatoxins, and other waste substances that have been linked to organ edema and organ dysfunction and need a diuretic to reverse.

Acute normovolemic hemodilution (ANH) is a form of autologous transfusion where whole blood is collected from a patient at the start of surgery into a standard blood collection bag with anticoagulant with the simultaneous replacement of intracellular volume using acellular fluids (such as normal saline). The patient's own blood is re-infused at the end of the surgical case (presumably when any bleeding has stopped).

=== Ultrafiltration ===
Hemofiltration or ultrafiltration devices constitute the third major type of blood salvage in operating rooms. In general, ultrafiltration devices filter the patient's anticoagulated whole blood. The filter process removes unwanted excess non-cellular plasma water, low molecular weight solutes, platelet inhibitors and some particulate matter through hemoconcentration, including activated cytokines, anaphylatoxins, and other waste substances making concentrated whole blood available for reinfusion.

Hemofilter devices return the patient's whole blood with all the blood elements and fractions including platelets, clotting factors, and plasma proteins with a substantial Hb level. Presently, the only whole-blood ultrafiltration device in clinical use is the Hemobag. These devices do not totally remove potentially harmful contaminants that can be washed away by most RBC-savers. However, the contaminants that are potentially reduced by using RBC-savers, as shown by data from in vitro laboratory tests, are transient and reversible in vivo with hemostatic profiles returning to baselines within hours. The key is that coagulation and homeostasis are immediately improved with the return of concentrated autologous whole blood.

Over the years numerous studies have been done to compare these methods of blood salvage in terms of safety, patient outcomes, and cost effectiveness, often with equivocal or contradictory results.

== Prehospital and Trauma Applications ==
Traumatic hemorrhage in combat and rural disaster settings remains a leading cause of preventable death due to insufficient access to donor blood and delays in transfusion. Cases such as abdominal and junctional hemorrhage are particularly lethal because traditional tourniquets or direct pressure methods are often ineffective at stopping rapid bleeding.

Currently, blood salvage technologies are primarily designed for controlled hospital settings, which introduces challenges such as contamination risk, portability limitations, and the high-variability of traumatic wounds. Designs of these devices must preserve blood integrity, minimize hemolysis, and remain operable under austere environmental conditions with minimal training.

== See also ==
- Autotransfusionist
- Bloodless surgery
- Autotransfusion
