= Allergic transfusion reaction =

Adverse reaction to blood transfusion

An allergic transfusion reaction is a reaction that occurs when a blood transfusion results in an allergic reaction. It is among the most common transfusion reactions to occur. Reported rates depend on the degree of active surveillance versus passing reporting to the blood bank. Overall, they are estimated to complicate up to 3% of all transfusions. The incidence of allergic transfusion reactions is associated with the amount of plasma in the product. More than 90% of these reactions occur during transfusion.

== Cause ==
Allergic reactions from blood transfusion may occur from the presence of allergy-causing antigens within the donor's blood, or transfusion of antibodies from a donor who has allergies, followed by antigen exposure.

An allergic transfusion reaction is a type of transfusion reaction that is defined according to the Center for Disease Control (CDC) as:

== Diagnosis ==
An allergic transfusion reaction is diagnosed if two or more of the following occur within 4 hours of cessation of transfusion:

- Conjunctival edema
- Edema of lips, tongue and uvula
- Erythema and edema of the periorbital area
- Generalized flushing
- Hypotension
- Localized angioedema
- Maculopapular rash
- Pruritus (itching)
- Respiratory distress; bronchospasm
- Urticaria (hives)

A probable diagnosis results if any one of the following occurring within 4 hours of cessation of transfusion:

- Conjunctival edema
- Edema of lips, tongue and uvula
- Erythema and edema of periorbital area
- Localized angioedema
- Maculopapular rash
- Pruritus (itching)
- Urticaria (hives)

The UK hemovigilance reporting system (SHOT), has classified allergic reactions in to mild, moderate and severe. Reactions can occur that have features of both allergic and febrile reactions.

=== Mild ===
A rash, urticaria, or flushing

=== Moderate ===
Wheeze (bronchospasm) or angioedema but blood pressure normal and no respiratory compromise.There could also be abdominal cramping. There may or may not be an associated rash or urticaria.

=== Severe ===
This can be due to:

- Severe breathing problems (Bronchospasm, stridor), angioedema, or circulatory problems (e.g. hypotension) which require immediate medical treatment OR admission to hospital OR lengthens the duration of hospital admission.
- Anaphylaxis

== Prevention ==
To prevent allergic transfusion reaction it is possible to use patients own blood for transfusion, this is referred to as autologous blood transfusion. Patients' own blood is collected and washed to produce concentrated red blood cells (this blood product is also called packed red blood cells). There are multiple ways to wash red blood cells. The two main methods that are used to wash the cells are centrifugation, or filtration methods like the Hemoclear microfilter. The last option is reinfusion without washing. This is the least preferred method because of the chance of complications.

There is no evidence that antihistamine premedication prevents allergic transfusion reactions, although these drugs can mitigate symptoms once they occur.

== Treatment ==
Treatment of an allergic transfusion reaction is to immediately stop the transfusion. If the only symptoms are mild (i.e., hives and itching), the patient may be treated with an antihistamine and if the symptoms completely disappear and the patient feels well, the transfusion may be restarted. A mild transfusion reaction during infusion usually does not progress to a more severe anaphylactic reaction after infusion of additional product from the same unit. If the symptoms are more than mild, the transfusion should not be restarted.
