= Platelet transfusion =

Treatment for bleeding irregularities

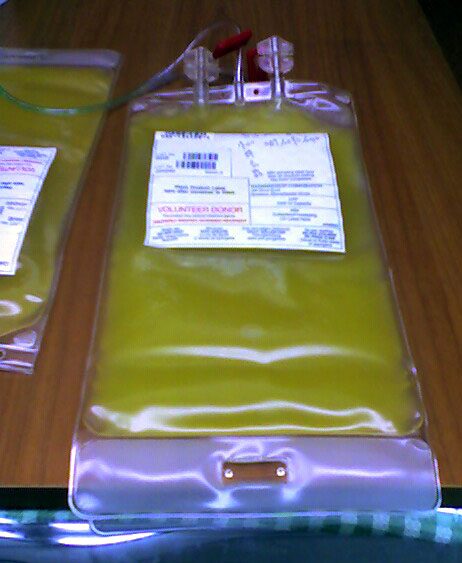
- A bag of platelets

Clinical data
- Other names: Platelet concentrate, platelet component
- ATC code: B05A (WHO)

Identifiers
- ChemSpider: none

Platelet transfusion, is the process of infusing platelet concentrate into the body via vein, to prevent or treat the bleeding in people with either a low platelet count or poor platelet function. Often this occurs in people receiving cancer chemotherapy. Preventive transfusion is often done in those with platelet levels of less than 10 billion/L. In those who are bleeding transfusion is usually carried out at less than 50 billion/L. Blood group matching (ABO, RhD) is typically recommended before platelets are given. Unmatched platelets, however, are often used due to the unavailability of matched platelets. They are given by injection into a vein.

Side effects can include allergic reactions such as anaphylaxis, infection, and lung injury. Bacterial infections are relatively more common with platelets as they are stored at warmer temperatures. Platelets can be produced either from whole blood or by apheresis. They keep for up to five to seven days.

Platelet transfusions came into medical use in the 1950s and 1960s. It is on the World Health Organization's List of Essential Medicines. Some versions of platelets have had the white blood cells partially removed or been gamma irradiated which have specific benefits for certain populations.

== Medication use ==
=== Prevention of bleeding ===
International guidelines recommend that platelets transfusions are given to people with reversible bone marrow failure to reduce the risk of spontaneous bleeding when the platelet count is less than 10 billion/L. If the person is well using a higher platelet count threshold does not reduce the risk of bleeding further.

==== Prevention versus treatment of bleeding ====
A review in people with blood cancers receiving intensive chemotherapy or a stem cell transplant found that overall giving platelet transfusions when the platelet count is less than 10 billion/L reduced the number of bleeding events and days with significant bleeding. However, this benefit was only seen in certain patient groups, and people undergoing an autologous stem cell transplant derived no obvious benefit. Despite prophylactic platelet transfusions, people with blood cancers often bleed, and other risk factors for bleeding such as inflammation and duration of thrombocytopenia should be considered.

There is little evidence for the use of preventive platelet transfusions in people with chronic bone marrow failure, such as myelodysplasia or aplastic anemia. Multiple guidelines recommend prophylactic platelet transfusions are not used routinely in people with chronic bone marrow failure, and instead an individualised approach should be taken.

Several studies have now assessed the benefit of using preventive platelet transfusions in adults with dengue who have profound thrombocytopenia (platelet count < 20 billion/L. There is no evidence that this reduce the risk of bleeding, but there is evidence that they increase the risk of harm due to the platelet transfusion (increased risk of a transfusion reaction including anaphylaxis).

==== Platelet transfusion threshold ====
Two reviews in people with blood cancers receiving intensive chemotherapy or a stem cell transplant found that overall giving platelet transfusions when the platelet count is less than 10 billion/L compared to giving platelet transfusions when the platelet count is less than 20 or 30 billion/L had no effect on the risk of bleeding.

Higher platelet transfusion thresholds have been used in premature neonates, but this has been based on limited evidence. There is now evidence that using a high platelet count threshold (50 billion/L) increases the risk of death or bleeding compared to a lower platelet count threshold (25 billion/L) in premature neonates.

==== Dose ====
A review in people with blood cancers compared different platelet transfusion doses. This review found no difference in the number of people who had clinically significant bleeding between platelet transfusions that contained a small number of platelets (low dose – 1.1 × 10^{11}/m^{2}) and those that contained an intermediate number of platelets (intermediate dose – 2.2 × 10^{11}/m^{2}). This review also found no difference in the number of people who had clinically significant bleeding between platelet transfusions that contained a small number of platelets and those that contained a large number of platelets (high dose – 4.4 × 10^{11}/m^{2}). One of the review's included studies reported on transfusion reactions. This study's authors suggested that a high-dose platelet transfusion strategy may lead to a higher rate of transfusion-related adverse events.

==== Prior to procedures ====
In people with a low platelet count, prophylactic platelet transfusions do not need to be given prior to procedures that have a low risk of causing bleeding. Low-risk procedures include surgical sites that do not contain many blood vessels e.g. cataract surgery, or minor procedures. The evidence is very uncertain about the effect of platelet transfusions prior to surgery for people with a low platelet count on the all-cause mortality, the number of participants with bleeding events after surgery, serious surgery-related or transfusion-related adverse events.

Guidelines recommend that it is safe to perform central venous catheter insertion when the platelet count is 20 billion/L or above. The evidence for this is based on observational studies in which bleeding occurred due to procedure error rather than due to the platelet count.

Platelet transfusion thresholds for more major procedures are based on expert opinion alone. Guidelines recommend a threshold of 50 billion/L for major surgery and a threshold of 100 billion/L for surgery on the brain or the back of the eye. Platelet transfusion may be indicated for patients with spontaneous intracerebral hemorrhage to reverse aspirin effect if they require emergency neurosurgery, but not if they are managed without surgery.

=== Treatment of bleeding ===
There is little evidence for the effectiveness of platelet transfusions or the optimal dose when a person with a low platelet count is actively bleeding. Current recommendations are based on consensus guidelines from around the world.

== Side effects ==
Side effects can include allergic reactions such as anaphylaxis, infection, and lung injury. Bacterial infections are relatively more common with platelets as they are stored at warmer temperatures.

== Usage ==
People with hematological disorders or cancer receive the largest proportion of platelet transfusions. Most are given to prevent bleeding during treatment with chemotherapy or stem cell transplant. Much of the remainder are used in general medicine, cardiac surgery and in intensive care.

Unlike other blood products demand for platelet transfusions appears to be increasing in several countries around the world. An ageing population, an increase in the number of people with blood cancer, and changes to the management of these cancers are likely the major reasons for the rise in demand for platelets. Since 1990, the number of stem cell transplants performed in Europe has risen from 4,200 to over 40,000 annually.

== History ==
Platelet transfusions came into medical use in the 1950s and 1960s. It is on the World Health Organization's List of Essential Medicines.

== Society and culture ==
In the United Kingdom it costs the NHS about 200 pounds per unit.

=== Manufacture ===
Platelets can be produced either from whole blood donations or by apheresis. They keep for up to five to seven days.

Platelet components can have had the white blood cells partially removed (leucodepleted) which decreases the risk of having a transfusion reaction. They can be treated with ultraviolet light which decreases the risk of transmission of certain infections. They can be gamma irradiated which have specific benefits for certain populations (those at risk of transfusion-associated graft versus host disease).
