= Plasma frozen within 24 hours =

Human blood plasma product

Plasma frozen within 24 hours after phlebotomy, commonly called FP24, PF‑24, or similar names, is a frozen human blood plasma product used in transfusion medicine. It differs from fresh-frozen plasma (FFP) in that it is frozen within 24 hours of blood collection, whereas FFP is frozen within 8 hours. The phrase "FFP" is sometimes used to refer to any frozen blood plasma product intended for transfusion.

PF24 is stored, thawed, and infused with the same procedures used for FFP. Although it is technically a different product, most healthcare providers continue to refer to FFP when the actual component is PF24.

== History ==
The production of PF24 began in response to an increase in reported cases of transfusion-related acute lung injury, or TRALI. The proposed mechanism of TRALI involves antibodies from donor blood components (predominantly plasma) that are directed against human leukocyte antigens (HLA). These antibodies are most numerous in women who have been pregnant more than once. Thus, removing these women from the donor pool for frozen plasma was proposed as a solution to the TRALI problem (the women's plasma could still be used for production of other components, including cryoprecipitate). However, removing roughly half of the donor pool was not a viable alternative, given the increasing need for plasma transfusion.

The PF24 approach was pioneered in the United Kingdom beginning in 2004 and in the United States beginning in 2007. The use of PF24 has been accompanied by a decrease in the incidence of TRALI—a roughly 50% reduction in reported cases. Long-term studies on the effectiveness of PF24 in massive transfusion have not been conducted.

This does not address the question of risk from plasma in other components, particularly apheresis platelets. Removing multiparous women from this limited donor pool would likely cause too great a shortage of platelets, resulting in more deaths (due to hemorrhage) than are seen due to TRALI after platelet infusion.

PF24 has roughly 70% of the blood coagulation-factor activity of FFP. Given the fact that there is typically an overabundance of coagulation factors in normal plasma, the decrease noted in PF24 is not thought to be clinically significant.

== Production ==
Much of the donor blood supply is obtained at "remote" blood donation events, such as blood drives at colleges, community events, etc., rather than at dedicated donation centers. The time required for transportation and processing often precludes production of FFP in such cases; that is the plasma cannot be separated and frozen within 8 hours of collection. However, the (male) donor blood can be separated into packed red blood cells and plasma within 24 hours (and usually less).
