= Organic acid =

Organic compound with acidic properties

An organic acid is an organic compound with acidic properties. The most common organic acids are the carboxylic acids, whose acidity is associated with their carboxyl group –COOH. Sulfonic acids, containing the group –SO_{2}OH, are relatively stronger acids. Alcohols, with –OH, can act as acids but they are usually very weak. The relative stability of the conjugate base of the acid determines its acidity. Other groups can also confer acidity, usually weakly: the thiol group –SH, the enol group, and the phenol group. In biological systems, organic compounds containing these groups are generally referred to as organic acids.

A few common examples include:

- Lactic acid
- Acetic acid
- Formic acid
- Citric acid
- Oxalic acid
- Uric acid
- Malic acid
- Tartaric acid
- Butyric acid
- Folic acid

== Characteristics ==
In general, organic acids are weak acids and do not dissociate completely in water, whereas the strong mineral acids do. Lower molecular mass organic acids such as formic and lactic acids are miscible in water, but higher molecular mass organic acids, such as benzoic acid, are insoluble in molecular (neutral) form.

On the other hand, most organic acids are very soluble in organic solvents. p-Toluenesulfonic acid is a comparatively strong acid used in organic chemistry often because it is able to dissolve in the organic reaction solvent.

Exceptions to these solubility characteristics exist in the presence of other substituents that affect the polarity of the compound.

== Applications ==
Simple organic acids like formic or acetic acids are used for oil and gas well stimulation treatments. These organic acids are much less reactive with metals than are strong mineral acids like hydrochloric acid (HCl) or mixtures of HCl and hydrofluoric acid (HF). For this reason, organic acids are used at high temperatures or when long contact times between acid and pipe are needed.

The conjugate bases of organic acids such as citrate and lactate are often used in biologically compatible buffer solutions.

Citric and oxalic acids are used as rust removal. As acids, they can dissolve the iron oxides, but without damaging the base metal as do stronger mineral acids. In the dissociated form, they may be able to chelate the metal ions, helping to speed removal.

Biological systems create many more complex organic acids such as L-lactic, citric, and D-glucuronic acids that contain hydroxyl or carboxyl groups. Human blood and urine contain these plus organic acid degradation products of amino acids, neurotransmitters, and intestinal bacterial action on food components. Examples of these categories are alpha-ketoisocaproic, vanilmandelic, and D-lactic acids, derived from catabolism of L-leucine and epinephrine (adrenaline) by human tissues and catabolism of dietary carbohydrate by intestinal bacteria, respectively. Organic acids (C_{1}–C_{7}) are widely distributed in nature as normal constituents of plants or animal tissues. They are also formed through microbial fermentation of carbohydrates mainly in the large intestine. They are sometimes found in their sodium, potassium, or calcium salts, or even stronger double salts.

The general structure of a few weak organic acids. From left to right: phenol, enol, alcohol, thiol. The acidic hydrogen in each molecule is colored red.

The general structure of a few organic acids. From left to right: carboxylic acid, sulfonic acid. The acidic hydrogen in each molecule is colored red.

=== In food ===
Organic acids are used in food preservation because of their effects on bacteria. The key basic principle on the mode of action of organic acids on bacteria is that non-dissociated (non-ionized) organic acids can penetrate the bacteria cell wall and disrupt the normal physiology of certain types of bacteria that we call pH-sensitive, meaning that they cannot tolerate a wide internal and external pH gradient. Among those bacteria are Escherichia coli, Salmonella spp., C. perfringens, Listeria monocytogenes, and Campylobacter species.

Upon passive diffusion of organic acids into the bacteria, where the pH is near or above neutrality, the acids will dissociate and raise the bacteria internal pH, leading to situations that will not impair nor stop the growth of bacteria. On the other hand, the anionic part of the organic acids that can escape the bacteria in its dissociated form will accumulate within the bacteria and disrupt few metabolic functions, leading to osmotic pressure increase, incompatible with the survival of the bacteria.

It has been well demonstrated that the state of the organic acids (undissociated or dissociated) is not important to define their capacity to inhibit the growth of bacteria, compared to undissociated acids.

Lactic acid and its salts sodium lactate and potassium lactate are widely used as antimicrobials in food products, in particular, dairy and poultry such as ham and sausages.

=== In nutrition and animal feeds ===
Organic acids have been used successfully in pig production for more than 25 years. Although less research has been done in poultry, organic acids have also been found to be effective in poultry production.

Organic acids added to feeds should be protected to avoid their dissociation in the crop and in the intestine (high pH segments) and reach far into the gastrointestinal tract, where the bulk of the bacteria population is located.

From the use of organic acids in poultry and pigs, one can expect an improvement in performance similar to or better than that of antibiotic growth promoters, without the public health concern, a preventive effect on the intestinal problems like necrotic enteritis in chickens and Escherichia coli infection in young pigs. Also one can expect a reduction of the carrier state for Salmonella species and Campylobacter species.

=== Ongoing research ===
In addition to the end uses previously seen, organic acids have been tested for the following applications:

Barbero-López and colleagues tested at the University of Eastern Finland the potential use of three organic acids, acetic, formic and propionic acids, in wood preservation. They showed a high antifungal potential against the decaying fungi tested (brown rotting fungi Coniophora puteana, Rhodonia placenta and Gloeophyllum trabeum; White rotting fungus Trametes versicolor) in Petri dish. However, when they treated wood with organic acids, the acids leached out from wood and did not prevent degradation. Additionally, the organic acids' acidity may have caused chemical degradation on wood. Additionally, in a more recent study, the ecotoxicity of several natural wood preservatives was compared, and the results indicated a very low toxicity of propionic acid.

== See also ==
- List of carboxylic acids
- Acid-base extraction
- Organic base
