= Washed red blood cells =

Artificial preparation of red blood cells

Washed red blood cells are red blood cells that have had most of the plasma, platelets and white blood cells removed and replaced with saline or another type of preservation solution. The most common reason for using washed red blood cells in transfusion medicine is to prevent the recurrence of severe allergic transfusion reactions that do not respond to medical treatment. The usual cause of these allergic reactions is proteins in the donor plasma. These proteins are removed by the process of washing the red blood cells.

== Methods of washing red cells ==
There are multiple methods of washing red cells. These can include automated or manual methods. They can use centrifugation or centrifugation-free methods. The red cells can be re-suspended in saline or other types of special preservative solutions for red cells, such as SAGM (saline, adenine, glucose and mannitol).

== Medical uses ==
=== Prevention of recurrence of severe allergic reactions ===
The most common reason for using washed red blood cells in transfusion medicine is to prevent the recurrence of severe allergic transfusion reactions. The allergen is usually a protein in the plasma that is removed by the process of washing the red blood cells. Various proteins, such as antibodies directed against IgA or haptoglobin in people with IgA and haptoglobin deficiency, have been suggested to have a causal relationship with the allergic reaction. Cytokines and chemokines, which accumulate during the storage of blood components, have also been suggested as causative agents. However, the literature is scarce and conflicting, as passive infusion of anti-IgA antibodies in to recipients has not been found to cause an allergic reaction.

=== Reduction in transfusion-related complications ===
In neonates, transfusion has been associated with a decreased risk of serious side effects including:

- Necrotising enterocolitis (NEC)
- Intraventricular haemorrhage (IVH)
- Retinopathy of prematurity (ROP)
- Chronic lung disease (CLD)
- Death

Transfusion-related immune modulation has been thought to be the underlying mechanism. Washing red cells has been thought to be one way of potentially decreasing the risk of theses transfusion-related side-effects. However, in neonates, there is insufficient evidence to say whether washing red cells has any effect.

== Storage ==
Once red blood cells have been washed, they can only be kept for up to a day.
