= Fresh frozen plasma =

Liquid portion of whole blood

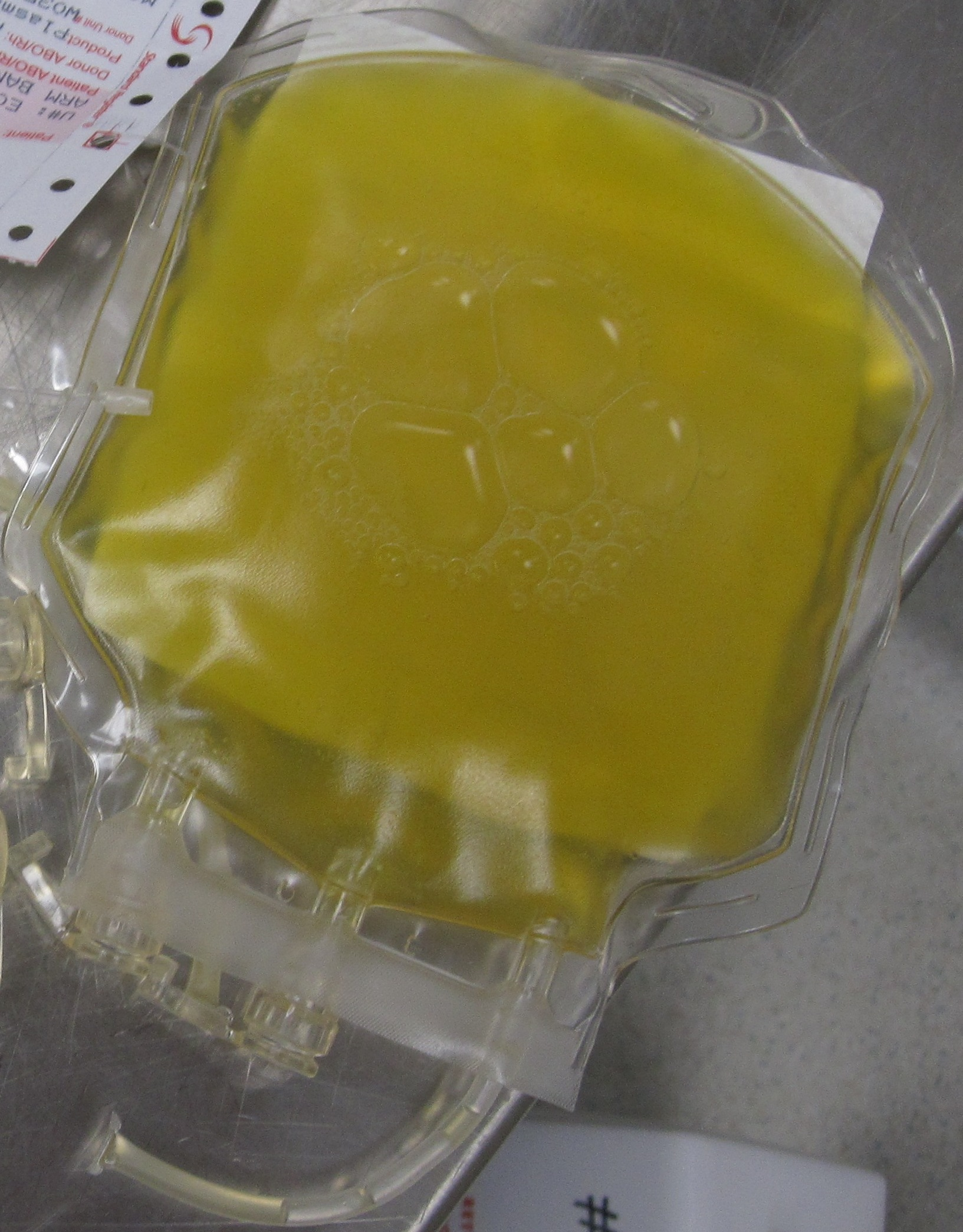
- A bag containing one unit of fresh frozen plasma

Clinical data
- Other names: Plasma frozen within 24 hours after phlebotomy (FP24)
- AHFS/Drugs.com: Micromedex Detailed Consumer Information
- ATC code: B05AX03 (WHO)

Identifiers
- ChemSpider: none

Fresh frozen plasma (FFP) is a blood product made from the liquid portion of whole blood. It is used to treat conditions in which there are low blood clotting factors (INR > 1.5) or low levels of other blood proteins. It may also be used as the replacement fluid in plasma exchange. Using ABO compatible plasma, while not required, may be recommended. Use as a volume expander is not recommended. It is administered by slow injection into a vein.

Side effects include nausea and itchiness. Rarely there may be allergic reactions, blood clots, or infections. It is unclear if use during pregnancy or breastfeeding is safe for the baby. Greater care should be taken in people with protein S deficiency, IgA deficiency, or heart failure. Fresh frozen plasma is made up of a complex mixture of water, proteins, carbohydrates, fats, and vitamins. When frozen it lasts about a year.

Plasma first came into medical use during the Second World War. It is on the World Health Organization's List of Essential Medicines. In the United Kingdom it costs about £30 per unit. A number of other versions also exist including plasma frozen within 24 hours after phlebotomy, cryoprecipitate reduced plasma, thawed plasma, and solvent detergent plasma.

== Definition ==
In the United States it refers to the fluid portion of one unit of whole blood that has been centrifuged, separated, and frozen solid at −18 °C (0 °F) or colder within eight hours of collection from whole blood donation or was otherwise collected via apheresis device. The phrase "FFP" is often used to mean any transfused plasma product. The other commonly transfused plasma, plasma frozen within 24 hours after phlebotomy (PF24), has similar indications as those for FFP. PF24 has slightly lower levels of Factors V and VIII than FFP. PF24 is more commonly used than FFP in the United States.

== Medical uses ==
There are few specific indications for FFP. These generally are limited to the treatment of deficiencies of coagulation proteins for which specific factor concentrates are unavailable or undesirable. A usual dose of plasma is 10–20 mL/kg recipient weight.

Indications for the use of FFP include the following:

- Replacement of isolated factor deficiencies: FFP is used to treat rare bleeding disorders when specific factor concentrates are not available. FFP is the usual treatment for factor V deficiency.
- Reversal of warfarin effect:
  Warfarin
  Patients who are anticoagulated with warfarin are deficient in the functional vitamin K dependent coagulation factors II, VII, IX, and X, as well as proteins C and S. These functional deficiencies can be reversed by the administration of vitamin K. For anticoagulated patients who are actively bleeding or who require emergency surgery, prothrombin complex concentrate (ideally, four factor PCCs) should be used if available. FFP/PF24/thawed plasma should only be used if more effective alternative treatments are not available. The ASA task force recommends starting with 5–8 mL/kg of FFP for warfarin reversal and rechecking laboratory values.
- Use in antithrombin III deficiency: FFP can be used as a source of antithrombin III in patients who are deficient of this inhibitor and are undergoing surgery or who require heparin for treatment of thrombosis. There are purified, human derived, as well as recombinant forms of antithrombin III available in the US.
- Treatment of immunodeficiencies: FFP is useful in infants with secondary immunodeficiency associated with severe protein-losing enteropathy and in whom total parenteral nutrition is ineffectual. FFP also can be used as a source of immunoglobulin for children and adults with humoral immunodeficiency. However, the development of a purified immune globulin for intravenous use (i.e., IVIG) has largely replaced fresh frozen plasma
- Treatment of thrombotic thrombocytopenic purpura: Therapeutic plasma exchange with FFP/PF24 or thawed plasma as the replacement fluid is considered the treatment of choice for patients with proven or suspected thrombotic thrombocytopenic purpura (TTP).

FFP is not recommended unless there is ongoing bleeding or there is a significant blood clotting problem. That is, FFP is not used in people to reverse warfarin if there is no bleeding, even for an INR > 9 unless they need urgent surgery. It is also not used in elective surgery, or non-emergency surgery.

Thawed plasma is made from FFP or PF24 and kept refrigerated (at 1–6 °C) after thawing can be stored for 5 days post thaw.

Prophylactic plasma transfusions might have an effect for people with a blood clotting disorder and receive an invasive procedure.

For people with a blood clotting disorder and receive a planned invasive non-cardiac procedure it is not certain if prophylactic plasma transfusions improve all-cause mortality up to 30 days, major bleeding within 24 hours, number of transfusions per participants within one week, number of individuals requiring a transfusion within one week and serious adverse events measured by plasma-related complications within 24 hours. Different triggers for fresh frozen plasma may have little to no effect on major bleeding within 24 hours and serious adverse events measured by plasma transfusion-related complications within 24 hours. Furthermore, different triggers for fresh frozen plasma may reduce the number of individuals requiring a transfusion within 7 days.

== Risks ==
The risks of FFP include disease transmission, anaphylactoid reactions, and excessive intravascular volume (transfusion associated circulatory overload (TACO)), as well as transfusion related acute lung injury (TRALI). Risks of transfusion transmitted infections are similar to that of whole blood and red blood cells.

== Chemistry ==
FFP is made by centrifugation of whole blood or apheresis device followed by freezing and preservation.

== Frequency of use ==
The use of plasma and its products has evolved over a period of four decades. The use of FFP has increased tenfold in the United States between the years 2000 and 2010 and has reached almost 2 million units annually. This trend may be attributable to multiple factors, possibly including decreased availability of whole blood due to widespread acceptance of the concept of component therapy.

== Alternatives ==
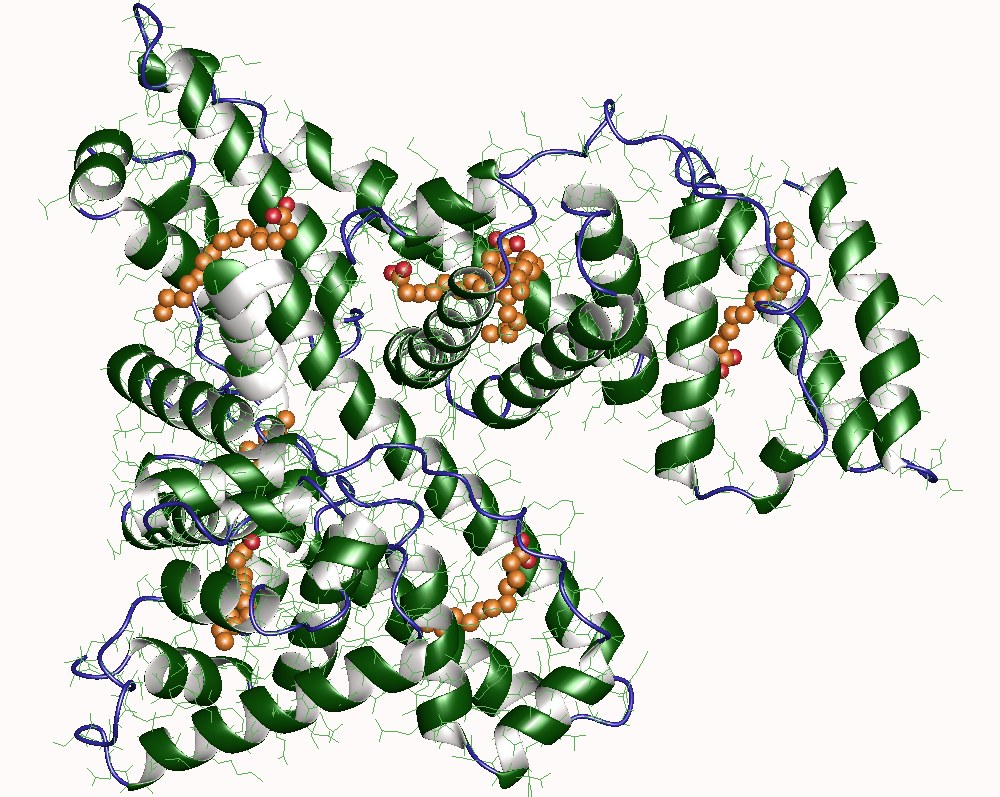
Albumin

Evidence indicates that other plasma components (e.g., single-donor plasma) that do not meet the criteria of FFP may have adequate levels of coagulation factors and are suitable for patients in whom FFP is indicated. Single-donor plasma is efficacious in the treatment of mild deficiencies of stable clotting factors. It also is of value in treatment of multiple deficiencies as in reversal of warfarin effects or in liver disease.

Safe and effective alternative treatment often exists so that FFP is no longer the therapy of choice in many conditions. Cryoprecipitate or fibrinogen concentrates should be used when fibrinogen is needed. For treatment of hemophilia A, recombinant factor VIII concentrates are available. For treatment of severe hemophilia B, recombinant factor IX concentrates are available.

Crystalloid or colloid solutions such as human serum albumin or plasma protein fraction, are preferable to FFP for volume replacement.

For nutritional support, amino acid solutions and dextrose are available. The most important alternative to the use of FFP is a comprehensive program of blood conservation. This includes measures such as intraoperative cell salvage and the realization that in many patients normovolemic anemia is not an indication for transfusion.
