= Haemonetics =

Healthcare company

Haemonetics Corp
- Type: Public
- Traded as: NYSE: HAE; S&P 400 component
- Industry: Medical Devices; Computer Software; Healthcare; Blood Banking
- Founded: 1971
- Headquarters: Boston, Massachusetts, USA
- Key people: Christopher Simon, CEO, President
- Revenue: ▲$1.3 Billion (FY2024)
- Number of employees: 3,300
- Website: haemonetics.com

Haemonetics Corporation is a global provider of blood and plasma supplies and services. The company was founded in Natick, Massachusetts by Dr. Allen (Jack) Latham in the 1970s.

Today, the company has expanded and has offices located in 16 countries. The company employs more than 1,800 people and markets its products in over 50 countries. Revenue is derived nearly equally from its three major markets -- Asia, Europe, and the Americas.

== History ==
The company was founded in 1971. Haemonetics started out producing the containers and bags required for blood collection. The Latham Bowl was a disposable container that could automate the separation of blood by centrifugation. Through the 90's, the company added additional product lines and technologies. The company opened a manufacturing facility in Holbrook, Massachusetts in 1988.

In 1995 the company purchased the Intravenous Solutions manufacturing facility in Union, South Carolina.

Additional acquisitions grew the company and expanded its services. In the following years the company branched off to making the whole plasma collection station including the machine, supplies and software for plasma collection. These acquisitions included Edmonton-based Fifth Dimension (5D) Information Systems to gain entry into the blood and plasma software industry. Further acquisitions include Chicago-based Arryx in July 2006, Information Data Management, Inc. in January 2007, the acquisition of a division of Haemoscope in 2007, the acquisition of Infonale in July 2007, and, in 2009, Chico, California-based Altivation and Tucson, Arizona-based Sebra.

On August 21, 2007, 5D and IDM were officially merged into a new subsidiary called Haemonetics Software Solutions. The employees at both Edmonton (5D) and Rosemont (IDM) continue to work from their respective offices.

Further acquisitions included the April 2009 acquisition of Neoteric Technology Ltd and the April 2010 acquisition of California-based Global Med Technologies, Inc. Haemonetics acquired the Pall Corporation's transfusion medicine business on August 1, 2012 for ~$550 million.

In April 2024, it was announced Haemonetics had completed its acquisition of the Chicago-headquartered medical device temperature regulation manufacturer, Attune Medical for $160 million.

== Product categories ==
Haemonetics products can be considered as belonging to two broad categories. Donor products (marketed to the blood donation industry, these include products that automate the blood donation process, automate the processing of blood, support pathogen inactivation and bacterial detection of blood, and test blood hematocrit); and products that are marketed to the surgical suite for blood loss management for patients. These products include surgical blood salvage (or "autotransfusion") devices, surgical field blood suction systems, and blood and patient warming systems.

=== Hemostasis ===
- TEG 5000
  - Kaolin TEG
  - Kaolin TEG with Heparinase
  - RapidTEG
  - TEG Functional Fibrinogen
  - TEG PlateletMapping
- TEG 6S
