= Arryx =

American technology company

Arryx, Inc. was a company that developed tools and technology for manipulation and measurement on the micro and nano length scales. Arryx's technology and products centered around optical trapping. They specialized in holographic optical trapping, a technique for creating and moving many optical traps at once. Their technology was commercialized in the form of a flagship research tool, the BioRyx 200 optical trapping system. Arryx has investigated the application of the technique to an array of problems in different fields including telecommunications, agriculture, healthcare, basic research, and forensics.

Arryx was founded in the fall of 2000, based on technology invented at the University of Chicago by Professor David G. Grier and his student Eric R. Dufresne a couple years earlier. Their BioRyx 200 system was released in early 2002 and won an R&D 100 Award later that year. An IR version of the system was released in 2004 for broader application to biological systems, with support of additional imaging methods including fluorescent microscopy.

In July 2006, Arryx was acquired by Haemonetics, with whom they had an ongoing partnership. On April 30, 2013, Arryx ceased operations, although Haemonetics pledges to continue to support the service agreements for Arryx products.
