= Sodium glycerophosphate =

Medication for supplementing phosphate

Clinical data
- Trade names: Glycophos
- AHFS/Drugs.com: Professional Drug Facts
- Pregnancy category: AU: Exempt
- Routes of administration: Intravenous infusion
- ATC code: B05XA14 (WHO)

Legal status
- Legal status: AU: Unscheduled

Identifiers
- IUPAC name: disodium 3-(phosphonooxy)propane-1,2-diol
- CAS Number: 1334-74-3; 55073-41-1
- PubChem CID: 22251426
- DrugBank: DB09561
- ChemSpider: 14071
- UNII: YP1H63LJ2K; RCS9EQ01V4
- KEGG: D10489
- ChEMBL: ChEMBL3040581

Chemical and physical data
- Formula: C_{3}H_{7}Na_{2}O_{6}P
- Molar mass: 216.036 g·mol^{−1}
- 3D model (JSmol): Interactive image
- Melting point: 98 to 100 °C (208 to 212 °F)
- Solubility in water: very soluble
- SMILES: [Na+].[Na+].OCC(O)COP([O-])([O-])=O
- InChI: InChI=1S/C3H9O6P.2Na/c4-1-3(5)2-9-10(6,7)8;;/h3-5H,1-2H2,(H2,6,7,8);;/q;2*+1/p-2; Key:GEKBIENFFVFKRG-UHFFFAOYSA-L; Key:OFNNKPAERNWEDD-UHFFFAOYSA-L

Sodium glycerophosphate, sold under the brand name Glycophos, is a medication used to supplement phosphate. It is administered via intravenous infusion.

Sodium glycerophosphate is an organic phosphate salt.

It was approved for medical use in Australia in November 2019.

It is an unapproved medication in the United States that was used as a substitute for inorganic phosphate during a drug shortage.

== Chemistry ==
The substance is a mixture of disodium glycerol 1- and 2-phosphates, which have different amounts of water of crystallization; the total amount is 5 1/2 H_{2}O per glycerol phosphate molecule. It is a white to off-white powder which may or may not be crystalline, has no discernible odor and tastes salty. It melts at 98 to 100 °C (208 to 212 °F) and decomposes at 130 °C (266 °F). Aqueous solutions have a pH of about 9.5.
