= Packed red blood cells =

Red blood cells separated for blood transfusion

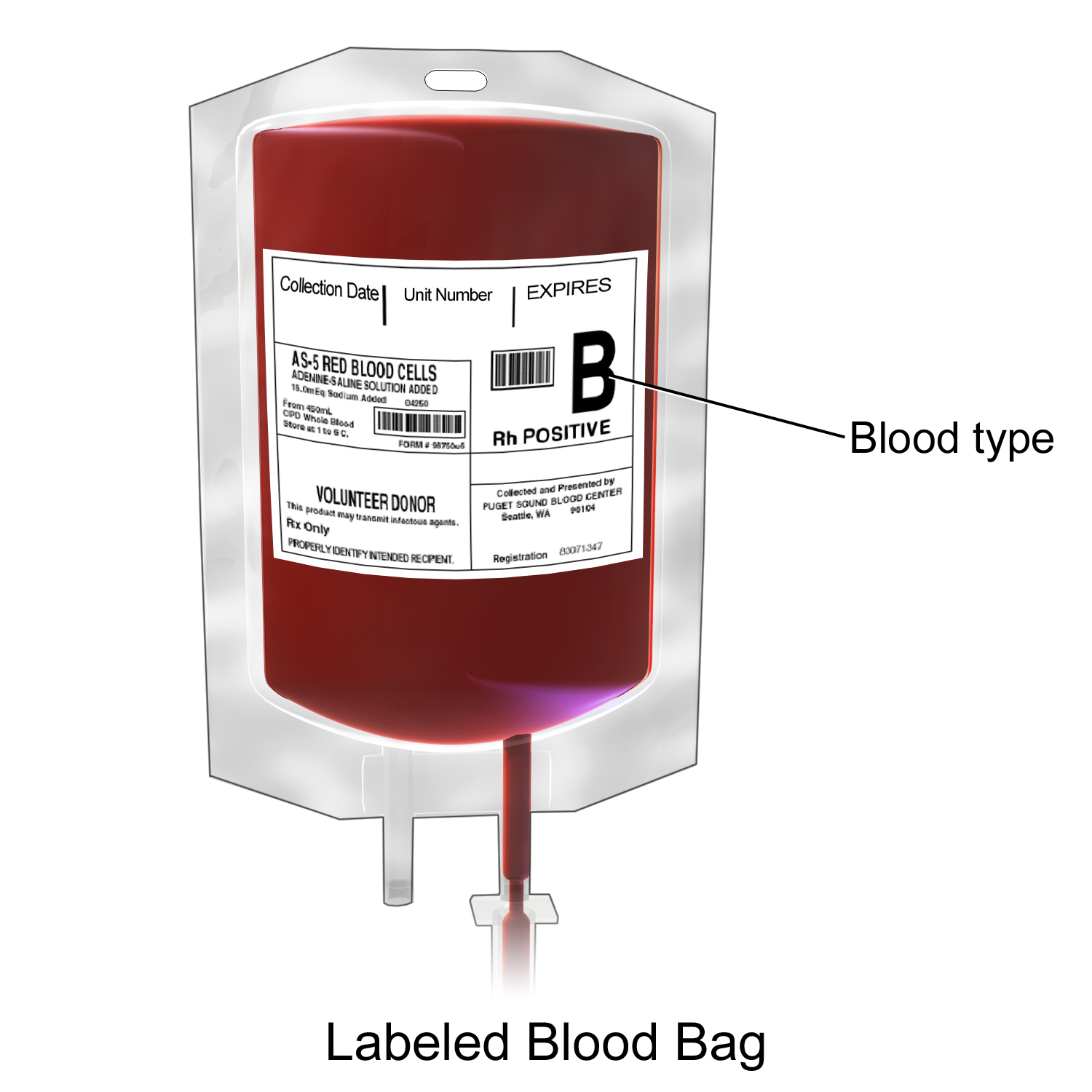
- Bag of packed red blood cells.

Clinical data
- Other names: Stored packed red blood cells, packed cells, red cell concentrate, red cell component
- Routes of administration: IV
- ATC code: B05AX01 (WHO)

Legal status
- Legal status: In general: ℞ (Prescription only)

Identifiers
- ChemSpider: none

Red blood cell concentrates, also known as red cell concentrates or packed red blood cells, are red blood cells that have been separated for blood transfusion. A red blood cell concentrate typically has a haematocrit of 0.50 – 0.70 L/L and a volume between 250 and 320 mL. Transfusion of red blood cell concentrates is indicated to compensate for a deficit caused by critical bleeding or to correct anaemic conditions, in order to increase the oxygen-carrying capacity and avoid detrimental effects caused by oxygen debt.

In adults, one unit brings up hemoglobin levels by about 10 g/L (1 g/dL). Repeated transfusions may be required in people receiving cancer chemotherapy or who have haemoglobin disorders. Cross-matching may be required before the blood is given. A red blood cell concentrate is given by injection into a vein. The widespread use of red blood cell concentrates as part of blood component therapy began in the middle of the 20th century, when polyvinyl chloride (PVC) blood bags were introduced as storage containers.

The widespread use of packed red blood cells began in the 1960s. It is on the World Health Organization's List of Essential Medicines. A number of other versions also exist including whole blood, leukocyte reduced red blood cells, and washed red blood cells.

== Clinical use of red blood cell concentrates ==
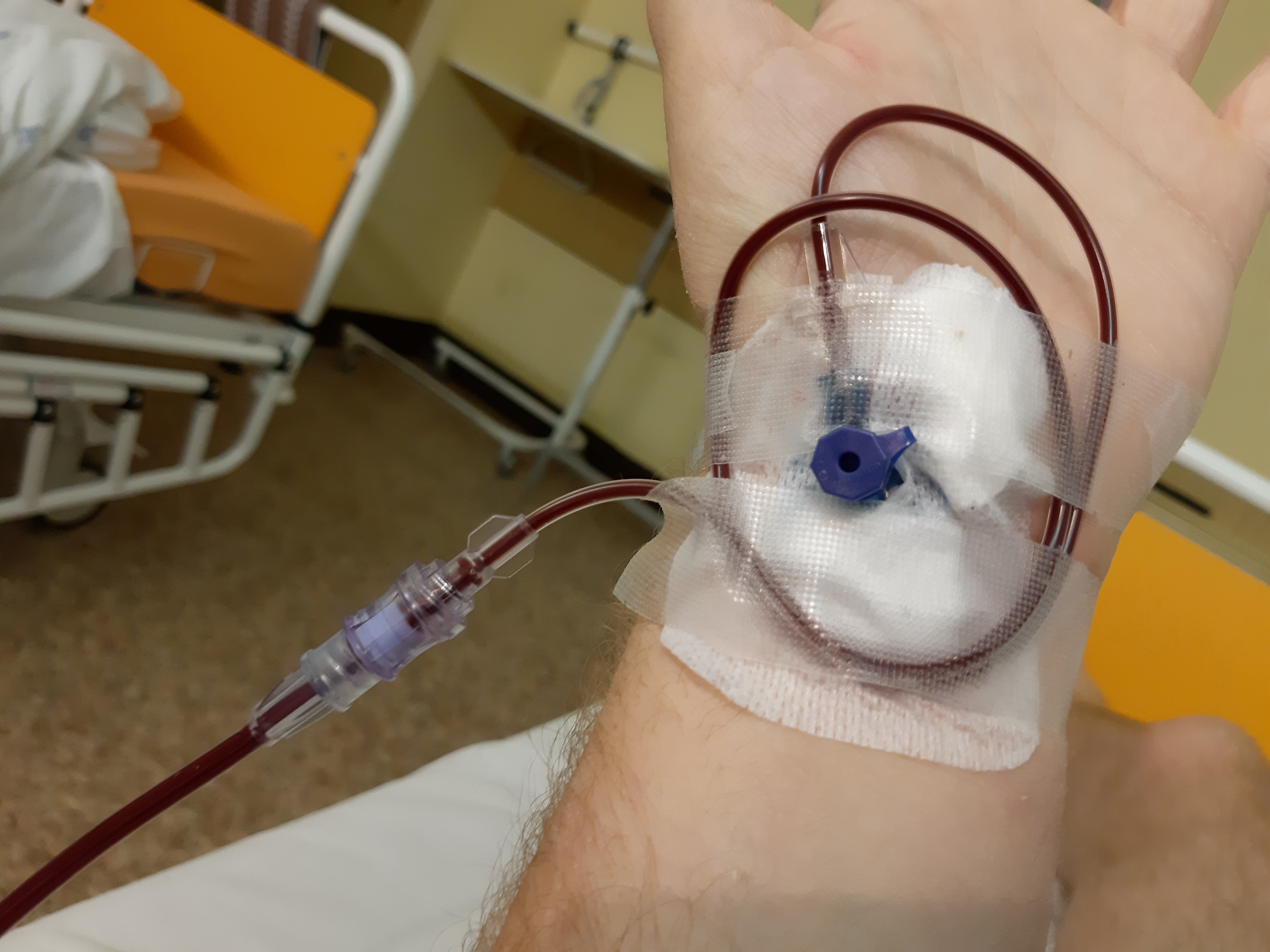
The patient receives a blood transfusion through the cannula.

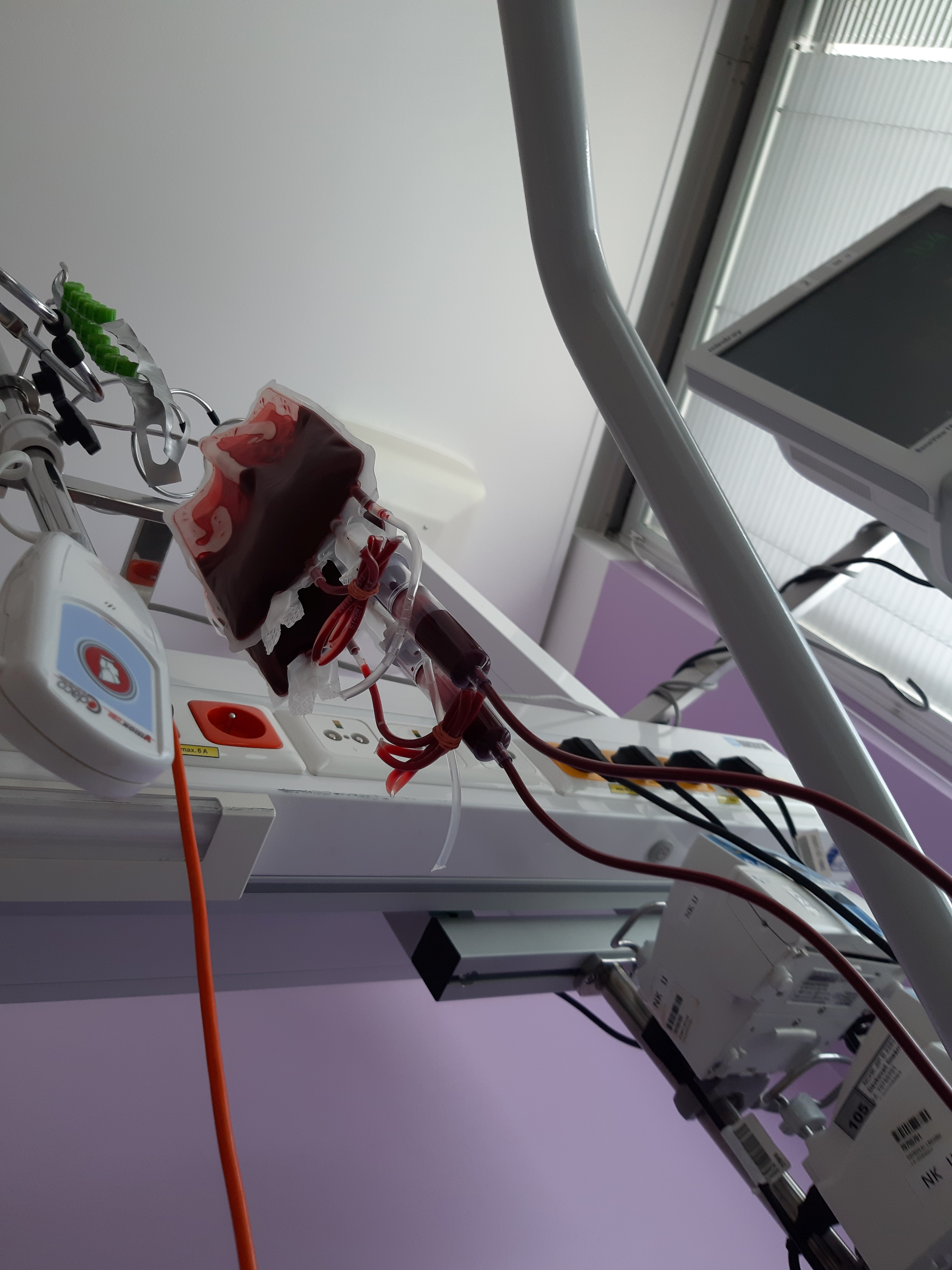
Blood bag during the blood transfusion process

Red blood cells are used to restore oxygen-carrying capacity in people with anaemia due to trauma or other medical problems

Whenever a red blood cell transfusion is being considered for a patient, it is good practice to consider not only the haemoglobin level, but also the overall clinical context, patient preferences, and whether there are alternative treatments. If a patient is stable and has a haematinic deficiency, they should be treated for the deficiency (iron deficiency, B_{12} deficiency, or folate deficiency) rather than being given a red blood cell transfusion.

In adults, blood transfusion is typically recommended when hemoglobin levels are below 70 g/L (7 g/dL) in those who have stable vital signs, unless they have anemia due to a haematinic deficiency. Transfusing at a restrictive haemoglobin threshold of between 70 g/L to 80 g/L (7 to 8g/dL) decreased the proportion of people given a red blood cell transfusion by 41% across a broad range of clinical specialties, including those people who are critically ill. There is no evidence that a restrictive transfusion strategy are stronger associated with death or major adverse events (e.g. cardiac events, myocardial infarction, stroke, pneumonia, thromboembolism, infection) compared with a liberal transfusion strategy. There is not enough information in some patient groups to say whether a restrictive or liberal transfusion threshold is better.

=== Single unit transfusion ===
This refers to transfusing a single unit or bag of red blood cells to a person who is not bleeding and haemodynamically stable followed by an assessment to see if further transfusion is required. The benefits of single unit transfusion include reduced exposure to blood products. Each unit transfused increases the associated risks of transfusion such as infection, transfusion associated circulatory overload and other side effects. Transfusion of a single unit also encourages less wastage of red blood cells.

=== Upper gastrointestinal bleeding ===
In adults with upper gastrointestinal bleeding transfusing at a higher threshold caused harm (increased risk of death and bleeding).

=== Heart surgery ===
A review established that in patients undergoing heart surgery a restrictive transfusion strategy of 70 to 80 g/L (7 to 8 g/dL) is safe and decreased red cell use by 24%.

=== Heart disease ===
There is less evidence available for the optimal transfusion threshold for people with heart disease, including those who are having a heart attack. Guidelines recommend a higher threshold for people with heart disease of 80 g/L (8 g/dL) if they are not undergoing cardiac surgery.

=== Blood cancers ===
There is insufficient evidence to suggest how to manage anemia in people with blood cancers in terms of transfusion thresholds.

=== Transfusion–dependent anemia ===
People with thalassaemia who are transfusion dependent require a higher hemoglobin threshold to suppress their own red cell production. To do this their hemoglobin levels should not be allowed to drop below 90 to 105 g/L (9 to 10.5 g/dL).

There is insufficient evidence to recommend a particular hemoglobin threshold in people with myelodysplasia or aplastic anemia, and guidelines recommend an individualized approach to transfusion.

=== Children ===
There is less evidence for specific transfusion thresholds in children compared to adults. There has only been one randomized trial assessing different thresholds in children, and this showed no difference between a restrictive or liberal transfusion strategy. This trial used similar thresholds to the adult studies, and transfusing when the hemoglobin is less than 70 g/L is also recommended in children.

=== Neonates ===
Neonatal red cell transfusion, and when it is appropriate depends on: the gestational age of the baby; how long since the baby had been born; and also on whether the baby is well or ill.

== Compatibility testing ==
To avoid transfusion reactions, the donor and recipient blood are tested, typically ordered as a "type and screen" for the recipient. The "type" in this case is the ABO and Rh type, specifically the phenotype, and the "screen" refers to testing for atypical antibodies that might cause transfusion problems. The typing and screening are also performed on donor blood. The blood groups represent antigens on the surface of the red blood cells which might react with antibodies in the recipient.

The ABO blood group system has four basic phenotypes: O, A, B, and AB. In the former Soviet Union these were called I, II, III, and IV, respectively. There are two important antigens in the system: A and B. Red cells without A or B are called type O, and red cells with both are called AB. Except in unusual cases like infants or seriously immunocompromised individuals, all people will have antibodies to any ABO blood type that isn't present on their own red blood cells, and will have an immediate hemolytic reaction to a unit that is not compatible with their ABO type. In addition to the A and B antigens, there are rare variations which can further complicate transfusions, such as the Bombay phenotype.

The Rh blood group system consists of around 50 different antigens, but that of the greatest clinical interest is the "D" antigen, though it has other names and is commonly just called "negative" or "positive". Unlike the ABO antigens, a recipient will not usually react to the first incompatible transfusion because the adaptive immune system does not immediately recognize it. After an incompatible transfusion the recipient may develop an antibody to the antigen and will react to any further incompatible transfusions. This antibody is important because it is the most frequent cause of hemolytic disease of the newborn. Incompatible red blood cells are sometimes given to recipients who will never become pregnant, such as males or postmenopausal women, as long as they do not have an antibody, since the greatest risk of Rh incompatible blood is to current or future pregnancies.

For RBCs, type O negative blood is considered a "universal donor" as recipients with types A, B, or AB can almost always receive O negative blood safely. Type AB positive is considered a "universal recipient" because they can receive the other ABO/Rh types safely. These are not truly universal, as other red cell antigens can further complicate transfusions.

There are many other human blood group systems and most of them are only rarely associated with transfusion problems. A screening test is used to identify if the recipient has any antibodies to any of these other blood group systems. If the screening test is positive, a complex set of tests must follow to identify which antibody the recipient has by process of elimination. Finding suitable blood for transfusion when a recipient has multiple antibodies or antibodies to extremely common antigens can be very difficult and time-consuming.

Because this testing can take time, doctors will sometimes order a unit of blood transfused before it can be completed if the recipient is in critical condition. Typically two to four units of O negative blood are used in these situations, since they are unlikely to cause a reaction. A potentially fatal reaction is possible if the recipient has pre-existing antibodies, and uncross matched blood is only used in dire circumstances. Since O negative blood is not common, other blood types may be used if the situation is desperate.

== Collection and Processing ==
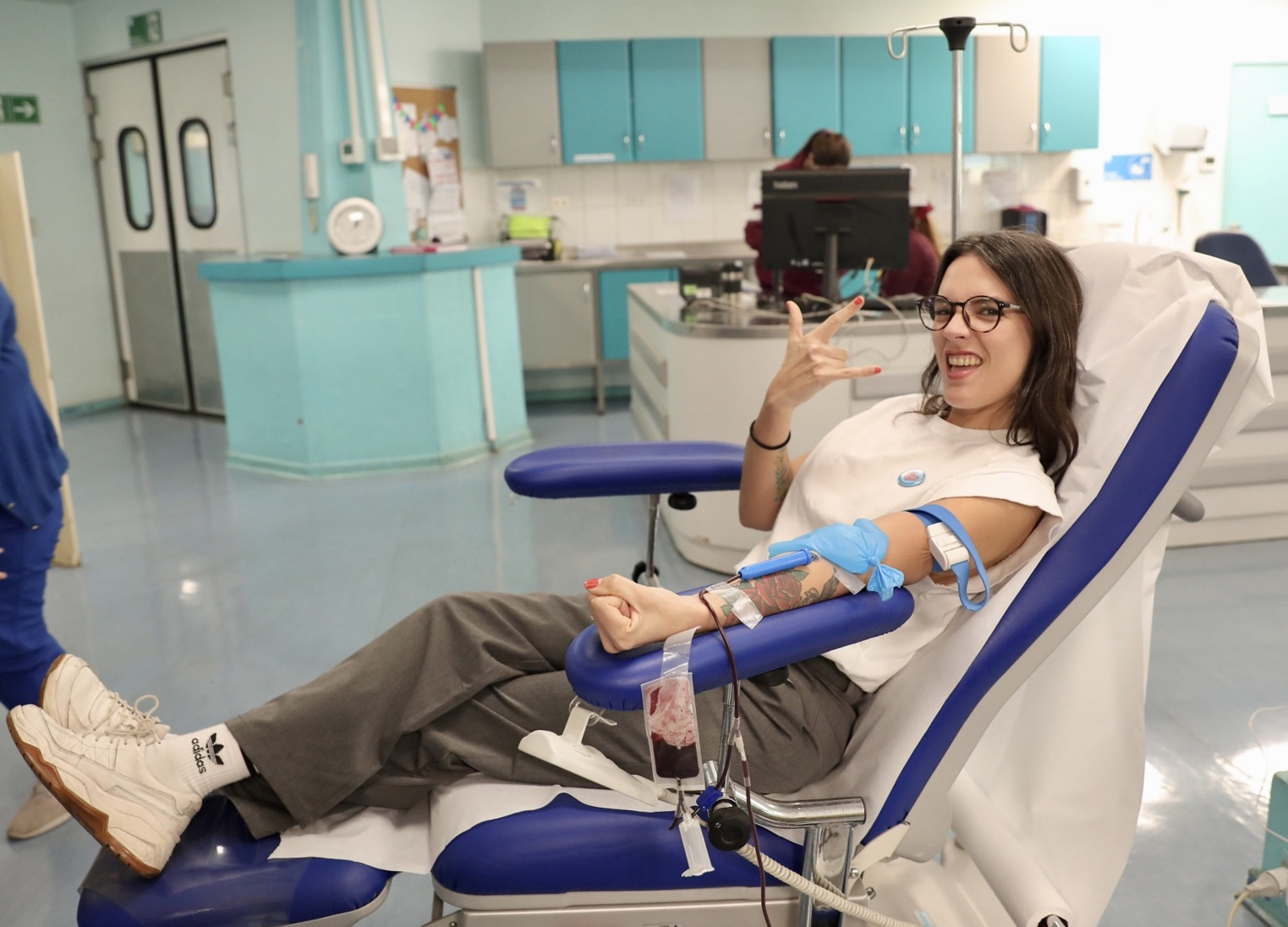
Chilean Minister Camila Vallejo donating blood

Red blood cell concentrates are produced either from whole blood or by apheresis. Production from whole blood is far more common than apheresis due to collection and production efficacy as well as economical purposes. When red blood cell concentrates are produced from whole blood, the whole blood is first separated through centrifugation (usually between 3000 to 5000 x g). The red blood cells are denser than plasma and the other present blood cells (platelets, white blood cells) and settle at the bottom of the blood bag. After centrifugation, the red blood cells are separated from the other components (the majority of the plasma, platelets and white blood cells) through the use of an extractor (also referred to as blood press).

After extraction, an additive solution is usually added in a ratio of 1:1.5 to 1:2. The purpose of the additive solution is to maintain adequate viscosity, provide nutrients and ATP/GTP building blocks and reduce haemolysis generation throughout blood bank storage. Choice of additive solution has an impact on the red blood cell viability and, thereby, shelf life (expiry date) of the red blood cell concentrate. Usually, shelf life is limited to 4 to 6 weeks, provided that the red blood cell concentrates are stored in adequate conditions (2-6 °C). Commercial additive solutions are typically based on saline. They usually contain glucose, adenine, mannitol and, sometimes, phosphate and guanosine. The additive solution has no, or very little, buffering capacity, but buffering is provided by the red blood cells themselves. Traditional additive solutions are hypotonic, although experiments with next-generation additive solutions suggest that an alkali pH in combination with low chloride concentrations may be able to prolong the red blood cell viability.

Leucocyte depletion of blood components, including red blood cell concentrates, is increasingly becoming standard practise; in many of the high-income countries of the world, 100% of the red blood cell supply is already being leucocyte depleted. Leucocyte depletion, usually by a leucocyte filter included in the blood bag system, is an efficient yet relatively cheap way of reducing the risk of transfusion reactions. Leucocyte depletion is most commonly performed as an integrated processing step, as bedside filtration is considered a less efficient method.

== Red blood cell modifications (secondary processing) ==
Red blood cell concentrates are sometimes modified to address specific needs of patients who, for different reasons, are unable to tolerate standard red blood cell concentrates.

=== Irradiated red blood cells ===
Even after leucocyte filtration, a residual number of leucocytes remain in the red blood cell concentrate (<1 million per unit). These may be harmful for patients who have an impaired, reduced or not yet fully developed immune system, or if the blood donor and recipient are closely related. Therefore, such patients may be issued irradiated blood components, including irradiated red blood cells. X-ray or gamma sources are usually used for irradiation. When blood components are irradiated, the DNA is destroyed in any remaining white blood cells (leucocytes), which stops the leucocytes from being able to proliferate further. Although efficient in reducing the risk of transfusion reactions including fatal transfusion-associated graft-versus-host disease (TA-GvHD), irradiation is damaging to the red blood cell membrane, which can be seen as increased levels of haemolysis during storage. As a consequence, irradiated red blood cell concentrates are usually given a reduced shelf life. Therefore, irradiation of red blood cell concentrates is commonly only performed on demand or for specific parts of the supply.

=== Washed red blood cells ===
Red blood cell concentrates still contain a small amount of plasma after standard processing (usually 10-15 mL). In order to reduce the risk of allergic reactions to plasma proteins, or to modify the red blood cell concentrates for patients who are sensitive to IgA or potassium ions (K^{+}), the red blood cell concentrates can be washed. Washing typically consists of diluting the red blood cells in saline-based washing solution or red blood cell additive solutions and then washing away any remaining plasma and debris during one or several centrifugation cycles. The process can be performed manually, or with an automated cell washer or processor.

=== Cryopreserved red blood cells ===
To increase the availability of RBCs of rare blood types, red blood cells can be stored cryopreserved (frozen) instead of refrigerated. With a controlled, standardised freezing and thawing process, the red blood cells can be stored in frozen condition for up to 30 years. Also for cryopreservation, cell processors are frequently used for both the pre-freezing glycerolisation procedure and for washing away the glycerol after thawing of the red blood cells. Using an automated device allows for standardised processing to ensure optimal protection from ice crystal formation, which otherwise could damage the red blood cells.

There are two general approaches for RBC cryopreservation, referred to as the high- and the low-glycerol method. Glycerol serves as cryoprotectant in both. The high-glycerol method uses 40% weight/volume glycerol, a slow freezing rate (1–3 °C per minute) and allows storage of the frozen red blood cells in common mechanical −60–80 °C freezers. The low-glycerol method is based on 20% weight/volume glycerol and demands plunge freezing in (−150 °C) liquid nitrogen. Because of the extreme storage temperature, the low-glycerol method is not compatible with the PVC tubes of blood bags. PVC tubes are essential for sterile docking; a technology which maintains a closed system after thawing and, thereby, allows a longer post-thawing shelf-life. Because of this, and also because the high-glycerol method seems to protect the red blood cells better and is associated with less haemolysis than the low-glycerol method, the high-glycerol method is often preferred.

=== Pathogen reduction of red cells ===
Pathogen reduction is a technology predominantly used to reduce the risk of transfusion-transmitted infectious diseases and bacterial contamination. The principle resembles the one of irradiation: by adding an agent which interferes with the replication process of DNA or RNA, any present pathogen, as well as any residual leucocytes, will not be able to replicate further.

Systems for pathogen inactivation of red blood cells are still awaiting market authorisation. However, studies suggest that the red blood cell quality is not negatively impacted by this processing procedure, which indicates that pathogen inactivation may be a suitable future substitute for irradiation and potentially also washing of red blood cells.

=== Red blood cell rejuvenation ===
Red blood cell rejuvenation is a method which aims to increase the levels of 2,3-diphosphoglycerate (2,3-DPG) and ATP in stored red blood cell concentrates, as the levels of both 2,3-DPG and ATP decrease over time. The rejuvenation process includes incubation of the red blood cells with a rejuvenation solution and subsequent washing. ATP is an important driver of a number of metabolic functions of the red blood cell, and declined ATP levels have been linked to reduced post-transfusion in vivo survival of the red blood cells. High levels of 2,3-DPG facilitates oxygen unloading from the red blood cells in the capillaries.

=== Paediatric modification of red blood cell concentrates ===
Red blood cell concentrates can be modified to be suitable for paediatric patients. These modifications include split of regular units into smaller units (usually 3 – 6 parts), which facilitates limiting the number of involved donors at repeated transfusions. The modification can also be red blood cells for intrauterine transfusion where, in short, the additive solution is removed, which increases the haematocrit to between 0.70 – 0.85. A red blood cell concentrate can also be tailored for exchange transfusions for neonates. During this process, the additive solution is removed and instead, plasma is added to resemble a "whole blood". Both at intrauterine and exchange transfusion, compatibility between the foetus/baby and the mother is of great importance.

== Adverse events related to red blood cell transfusion ==
Adverse events related to transfusion in general may include allergic reactions such as anaphylaxis, infection, volume overload, and lung injury. With current screening methods, the risk of viral infections such as hepatitis C and HIV/AIDS are less than one in a million. With current testing methods in high-income countries the prevalence of transfusion-transmissible infections in blood donations is very low (median: HIV 0.002%, hepatitis B 0.02%, hepatitis C 0.007% and syphilis 0.02% in 2024). However, in low-income countries the risk of a blood donation being positive for HIV, hepatitis C or syphilis is up to 1%, and the risk of it being hepatitis B positive was approximately 2.8% in 2024. The differences relate to variations in eligible blood donors, whether the donation is paid or voluntary, non-remunerated, and the effectiveness of the system of educating and selecting donors.

Adverse events related to transfusion of red blood cells are mainly linked to incompatibility issues or other transfusion reactions. Incompatible AB0 transfusion can be fatal. For patients with a previous transfusion reaction history, the risk of repeated adverse events can be mitigated by choosing the proper processing modification and/or red blood cell phenotype combination.

== Society and culture ==
=== Economics ===
In the United Kingdom they cost about £120 per unit. Prices range based on location and other factors like donation history.

=== Names ===
The product is typically abbreviated RBC, pRBC, PRBC, sometimes StRBC, or even LRBC (the latter being to indicate those that have been leukoreduced, which is now true for the vast majority of RBC units). The name "Red Blood Cells" with initial capitals indicates a standardized blood product in the United States. Without capitalization, it is simply generic without specifying whether or not the cells comprise a blood product, patient blood, etc. (with other generic terms for it being "erythrocyte" and "red cell").
