= Ethacridine lactate =

Pair of enantiomers

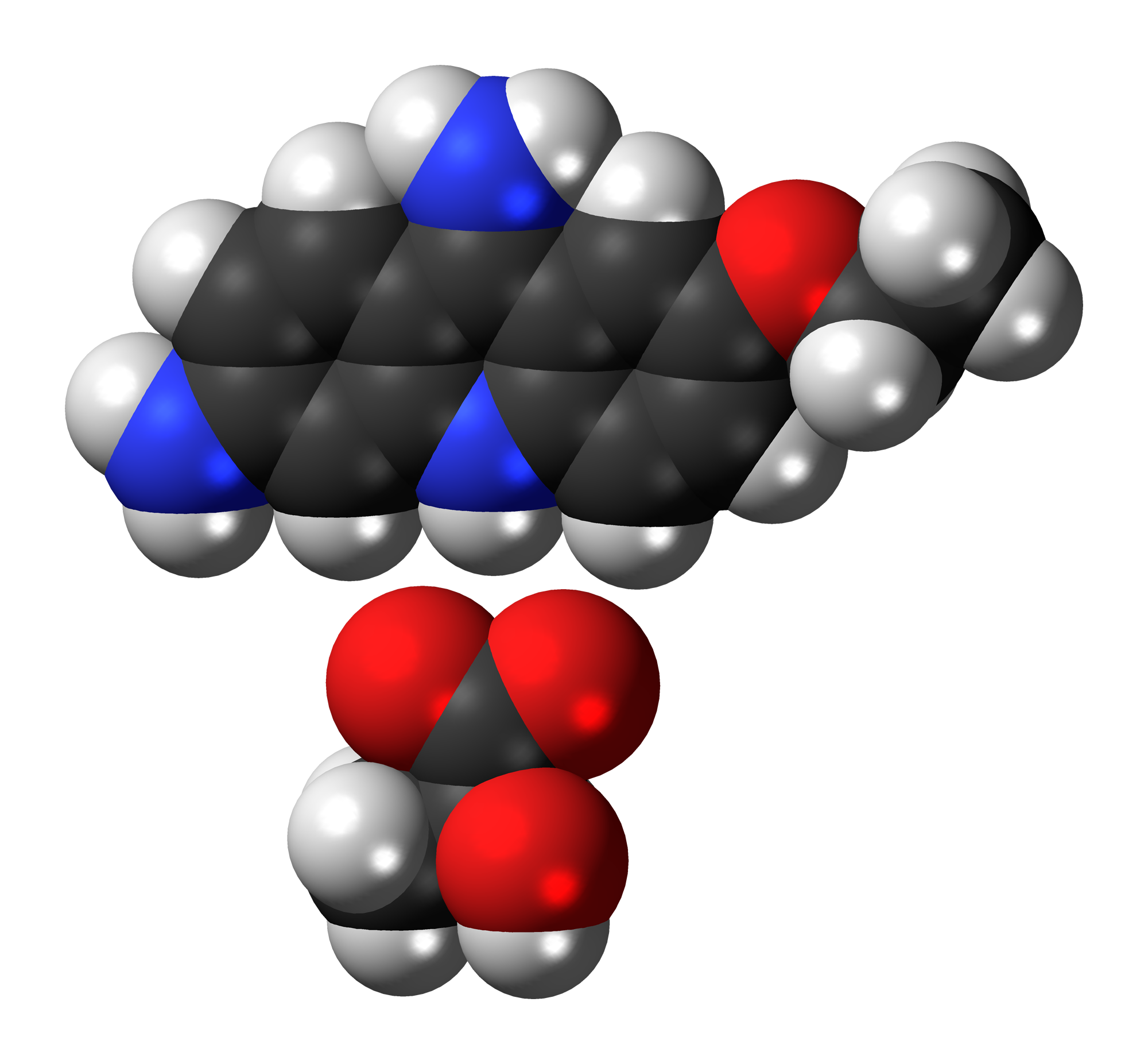

Clinical data
- AHFS/Drugs.com: International Drug Names
- ATC code: B05CA08 (WHO) D08AA01 (WHO)

Identifiers
- IUPAC name: 7-Ethoxyacridine-3,9-diamine 2-hydroxypropanoic acid
- CAS Number: 1837-57-6
- PubChem CID: 15789
- ChemSpider: 15012
- UNII: 7T7T2I9823
- KEGG: D01248
- ChEMBL: ChEMBL582355
- CompTox Dashboard (EPA): DTXSID10872472
- ECHA InfoCard: 100.015.826

Chemical and physical data
- Formula: C_{18}H_{21}N_{3}O_{4}
- Molar mass: 343.383 g·mol^{−1}
- 3D model (JSmol): Interactive image
- SMILES: O=C(O)C(O)C.O(c2ccc1nc3c(c(c1c2)N)ccc(c3)N)CC
- InChI: InChI=1S/C15H15N3O.C3H6O3/c1-2-19-10-4-6-13-12(8-10)15(17)11-5-3-9(16)7-14(11)18-13;1-2(4)3(5)6/h3-8H,2,16H2,1H3,(H2,17,18);2,4H,1H3,(H,5,6); Key:IYLLULUTZPKQBW-UHFFFAOYSA-N

Ethacridine lactate (ethacridine monolactate monohydrate, acrinol, trade name Rivanol) is an aromatic organic compound based on acridine. Its formal name is 2-ethoxy-6,9-diaminoacridine monolactate monohydrate. It forms orange-yellow crystals with a melting point of 226 °C and it has a stinging smell.

Its primary use is as an antiseptic in solutions of 0.1%. It is effective against mostly Gram-positive bacteria, such as Streptococci and Staphylococci, but ineffective against Gram-negative bacteria such as Pseudomonas aeruginosa.

Ethacridine is also used as an agent for second trimester abortion. Up to 150 ml of a 0.1% solution is instilled extra-amniotically using a foley catheter. After 20 to 40 hours, 'mini labor' ensues. In China, an intra-amniotic method has also been used. Ethacridine as an abortifacient is found to be safer and better tolerated than 20% hypertonic saline.
