= Surgicel =

Material used to control bleeding

Surgicel is a hemostatic agent (blood-clot-inducing material) made of an oxidized cellulose polymer (polyanhydroglucuronic acid), manufactured by the Ethicon subsidiary of Johnson & Johnson. It was introduced into clinical practice in 1947. It is used to control bleeding, including post-surgical bleeding and bleeding from superficial injuries to the skin.

Surgicel is used extensively in oral and maxillofacial surgery to control intrabony arterial bleeds from the inferior alveolar artery. It is frequently used to stop bleeding following newborn circumcision if pressure alone is inadequate. When placed in the mandibular canal with the inferior alveolar nerve exposed there have been reports of neurotoxic effects.

Common sizes include:

Item Number	Size
1951	2" x 14"
1952	4" x 8"
1953	2" x 3"
1961	1" x 2"
1962	2" x 4"
1963	4" x 4"
