= Solvent detergent plasma =

Processed form of blood plasma

Solvent detergent plasma is a form of blood plasma made from plasma collected from many people which is then processed with solvents as a form of virus processing, to try to get rid of viruses.
