= Autotransfusionist =

An autotransfusionist, also known as a perioperative blood management technologist, is a specialized allied health professional who operates the cell saver machine during surgeries that expect significant blood loss.

The autotransfusionist is responsible for collecting shed blood from the patient during the operation, scrubs or cleans the blood of impurities, then makes it available to be reinfused into the patient. The process is commonly known as "cell-saver" and is considered far superior to the use of blood from a donor, because it reduces the possibility of infection and provides more functional cells back to the patient. Because the blood is recirculated, there is no limit to the amount of blood that can be given back to the patient.

Autotransfusion can be achieved in the operating room, intensive care unit, and emergency department and require varying degrees of expertise depending on the procedure.

== Education ==
In order to become a Certified Perioperative Blood Management Technologist (CPBMT), one must:

- Have a minimum of a high school diploma or equivalent
- Be practicing in the field of blood management for a minimum of one year
- Complete a yearly minimum of fifty autotransfusion procedures.
