= Potassium lactate =

Names
- IUPAC name Potassium 2-hydroxypropanoate

Identifiers
| CAS Number | 996-31-6 |
| 3D model (JSmol) | Interactive image |
| ChEMBL | ChEMBL1200664 |
| ChemSpider | 55189 |
| ECHA InfoCard | 100.012.392 |
| E number | E326 (antioxidants, ...) |
| PubChem CID | 61248 |
| UNII | 276897E67U |
| CompTox Dashboard (EPA) | DTXSID80883631 |
- InChI: InChI=1S/C3H6O3.K/c1-2(4)3(5)6;/h2,4H,1H3,(H,5,6);/q;+1/p-1 Key: PHZLMBHDXVLRIX-UHFFFAOYSA-M
- SMILES: [K+].[O-]C(=O)C(O)C

Properties
| Chemical formula | C_{3}H_{5}KO_{3} |
| Molar mass | 128.168 |

Pharmacology
| ATC code | B05XA15 (WHO) |
- Except where otherwise noted, data are given for materials in their standard state (at 25 °C [77 °F], 100 kPa). verify (what is ?) Infobox references

Potassium lactate is a compound with formula KC_{3}H_{5}O_{3}. It is the potassium salt of lactic acid and appears as a clear, hygroscopic, syrupy liquid suspension that is typically 60% solids. The substance can be concentrated to contain up to 78% solids. It is produced by neutralizing lactic acid, which is fermented from a sugar source. It has E number E326.

== Uses ==
=== Culinary uses ===
Potassium lactate is commonly used in meat and poultry products to extend shelf life and increase food safety, as it has a broad antimicrobial action and is effective at inhibiting most spoilage and pathogenic bacteria.

=== Fire fighting uses ===
Potassium lactate is used as an extinguishing medium in First Alert Tundra fire extinguishers.
