= Platelet concentrate =

Products containing platelet enriched blood

Platelet concentrates are products containing platelet enriched blood, which are used for platelet transfusions.

== Production and storage ==
Platelets can be isolated from whole blood using three methods, the platelet rich plasma method, the buffy coat method and with apheresis. Platelets are normally stored at room temperature (20 to 24 °C) in order to preserve their ability to circulate after transfusion. However, platelets can be stored at other temperatures, including refrigeration and cryopreservation for use in specific instances.

When stored at room temperature, the platelet concentrates are gently agitated at a speed of 60 strokes per minutes, so that the platelets remain in suspension. Platelets can be stored for up to seven days with maintenance of their function in patients. Due to their storage at room temperature, platelet concentrates are at risk of bacterial outgrowth if a unit is contaminated. Therefore, measures have been taken to prevent this. Bacterial screening within 24 to 36 hours after blood collection can be performed, pathogen inactivation can be performed, or the storage time can be shortened to 3 to 5 days.

During storage, platelet mainly metabolize glucose. Oxidative metabolism leads to the formation of carbon dioxide, and anaerobic metabolism leads to the formation of lactic acid. Both types of metabolism occur simultaneously. Both carbon dioxide and lactic acid acidify the storage medium, and the lowering of the pH of the storage medium affects the quality of the platelets. Below pH 6.2, the damage to the platelets is irreversible, and platelets do not circulate when transfused. Platelets are therefore stored in gas-permeable containers with a large volume-to-surface ratio, in order to expel carbon dioxide, which elevates the pH. Also, these containers allow for the entry of oxygen, favoring oxidative metabolism.

== Platelet additive solution ==
Originally, platelets were stored in the donor’s own plasma. Nowadays, many blood banks have switched to using platelet additive solution to store platelets. Typically, when platelets are isolated from whole blood, not all plasma is removed, as platelets need to be in a certain volume of plasma in order to have a clear separation from other cells. Platelet additive solution is added to bring the platelets to a concentration that sustains five to seven day storage. Consequently, platelets are typically stored in approximately one-third plasma and two-thirds platelet additive solution.

Platelet additive solutions contain nutrients to support platelet metabolism during their storage. Acetate is often used as nutrient. When acetate is metabolized, an hydroxy-ion is consumed, which elevates the pH. Platelet additive solutions may additionally contain a buffer to keep the pH above 6.2. Potassium and magnesium may be added to prevent untimely platelet activation. Due to the dilution of plasma, allergic reactions to plasma antigens are less frequent. Also, ABO antibody titers are fourfold lower, making ABO-incompatible transfusions easier.
