= Blood product =

Any therapeutic substance prepared from human blood

A blood product is any therapeutic substance prepared from blood, usually human blood; in some medicolegal contexts, the term refers specifically to human-blood-derived products. Blood products include whole blood, blood components, and blood plasma derivatives. Blood components include red blood cell concentrates or suspensions; platelets produced from whole blood or via apheresis; granulocytes; fresh frozen plasma; cryoprecipitates; antisera; and others. Some products for topical use, such as serum eye drops, have also been recently classified as blood components. Plasma derivatives are plasma proteins prepared under pharmaceutical manufacturing conditions, including: albumin; coagulation factor concentrates; and immunoglobulins.

Human blood and blood products come from blood donation, which can be from one person to another or from a person to themselves (such as when saving one's own blood for use after an upcoming surgical procedure).

== Relation to other substances ==
Blood products may also be called blood-derived products (or blood-based products) to differentiate them from blood substitutes, which generally refer to artificially produced products. Although many blood products have the effect of volume expansion, the group is usually distinguished from volume expanders, which generally refers to artificially produced substances and are thereby within the scope of blood substitutes.
