= Transfusion-related acute lung injury =

- Other names: TRALI
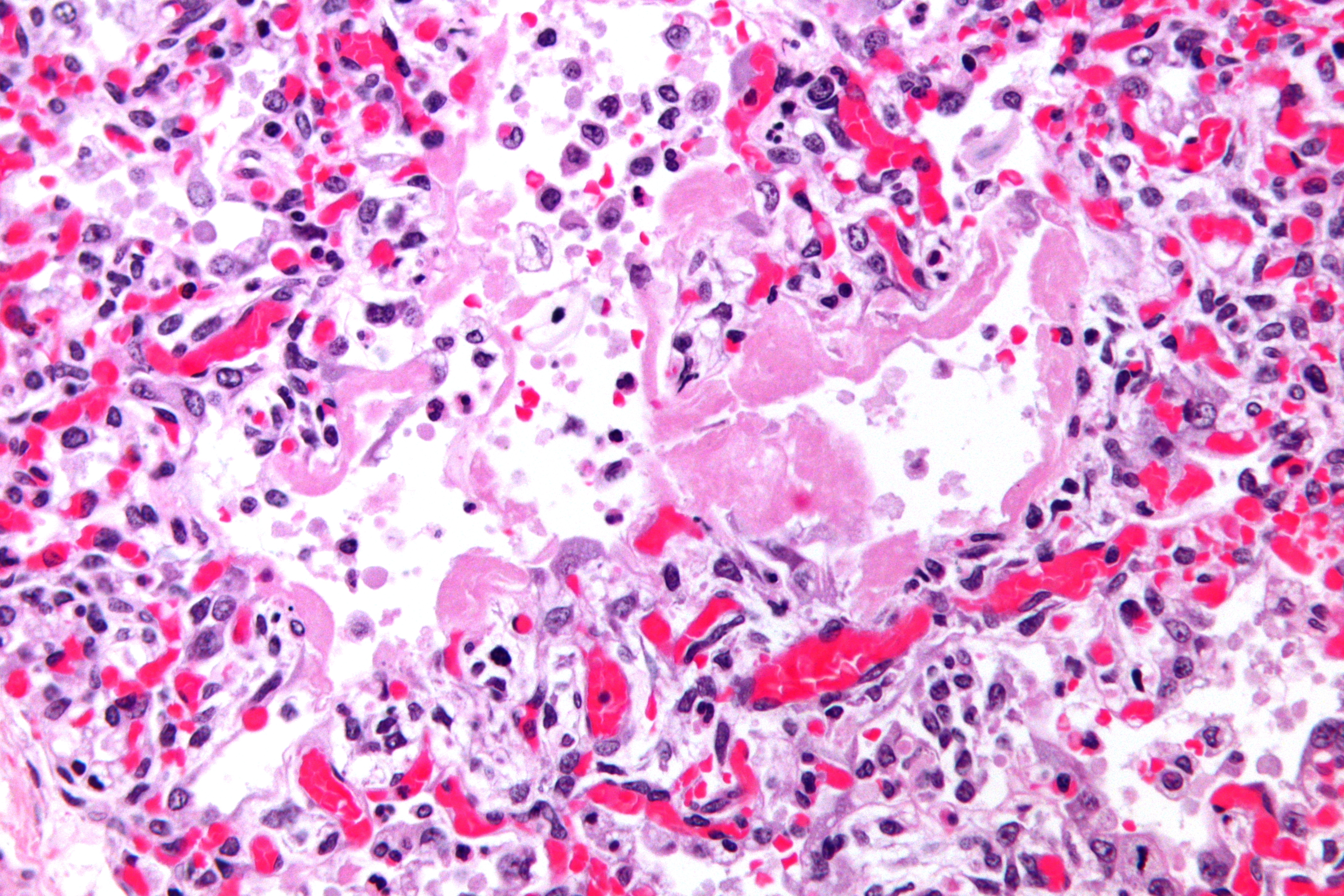
- Micrograph of diffuse alveolar damage, the histologic correlate of TRALI; H&E stain
- Specialty: Pulmonology

Transfusion-related acute lung injury (TRALI) is the serious complication of transfusion of blood products that is characterized by the rapid onset of excess fluid in the lungs. It can cause dangerous drops in the supply of oxygen to body tissues. Although changes in transfusion practices have reduced the incidence of TRALI, it was the leading cause of transfusion-related deaths in the United States from fiscal year 2008 through fiscal year 2012.

== Signs and symptoms ==
It is often impossible to distinguish TRALI from acute respiratory distress syndrome (ARDS). The typical presentation of TRALI is the sudden development of shortness of breath, severe hypoxemia (O_{2} saturation <90% in room air), low blood pressure, and fever that develop within 6 hours after transfusion and usually resolve with supportive care within 48 to 96 hours. Although low blood pressure is considered one of the important signs for diagnosing TRALI, in some cases high blood pressure can occur.

Delayed TRALI occurs 6 to 72 hours after transfusion completion. It is associated with a higher rate of mortality.

== Cause ==
The cause of TRALI is currently not fully understood. 80–85% of cases are thought to be immune mediated. Antibodies directed toward human leukocyte antigens (HLA) or human neutrophil antigens (HNA) have been implicated, with transfused antibodies shown to bind antigens expressed on pulmonary endothelial cells to initiate acute inflammation in the lungs. Women who are multiparous (have carried more than one pregnancy to viable gestational age) develop these antibodies through exposure to fetal blood; transfusion of blood components obtained from these donors is thought to carry a higher risk of inducing immune-mediated TRALI. Previous transfusion or transplantation can also lead to donor sensitization. To be at risk of TRALI via this mechanism, the blood recipient must express the specific HLA or neutrophil receptors to which the implicated donor has formed antibodies. A two-hit hypothesis has been suggested wherein pre-existing pulmonary pathology (i.e., the first-hit) leads to localization of neutrophils to the pulmonary microvasculature. The second hit occurs when the aforementioned antibodies are transfused and attach to and activate neutrophils, leading to release of cytokines and vasoactive substances that induce non-cardiac pulmonary edema.

A proposed mechanism for non-antibody-mediated TRALI involves the accumulation of bioactive lipids in stored blood components (red cells, platelets, or plasma) that are capable of priming neutrophils.

TRALI is typically associated with plasma products such as fresh frozen plasma. TRALI can also occur in recipients of packed red blood cells, whether adult or pediatric patients. Due to the higher risk of TRALI resulting from donations by females, the AABB (formerly the American Association of Blood Banks) has recommended that those blood components with a high volume of plasma not be used for transfusion, but for further processing into other therapeutic products. To mitigate the risk of TRALI, female donors are excluded from fresh frozen plasma donation in Germany as of 2009 if they have a history of pregnancy and there are no HLA/HNA screening results available, which has resulted in a significant reduction of TRALI reports.

== Pathophysiology ==
In TRALI, first-hit risk factors include long-term excessive alcohol use, shock, liver surgery, current smoking, higher peak airway pressure while undergoing mechanical ventilation, positive intravascular fluid balance, low levels of interleukin-10, and systemic inflammation. Systemic inflammation may be reflected in the plasma cytokine profiles but also via increased levels of C-reactive protein (CRP), an acute-phase protein that rapidly increases during acute infections and inflammation and is widely used clinically as a biomarker of inflammation. CRP has been shown to be elevated in TRALI patients and, in a mouse model, to functionally enable the first hit in the development of TRALI by increasing the accumulation in the lungs of a neutrophil homologous to interleukin-8. Another factor that can predispose patients to TRALI is pre-existing lung injury, which causes white blood cells to localize in the lungs' blood vessels. The second hit in TRALI may be conveyed by anti-leukocyte antibodies or other factors present in the transfusion product. In approximately 80% of cases, anti-HLA class I or II or anti-HNA antibodies are implicated as involved in triggering TRALI, although that figure may be even higher depending on the detection methods used. In the remaining 20% of TRALI cases, non–antibody factors or biological response modifiers are suggested to contribute the second hit, and these may possibly include lipid mediators, extracellular vesicles, and aged blood cells.

== Diagnosis ==
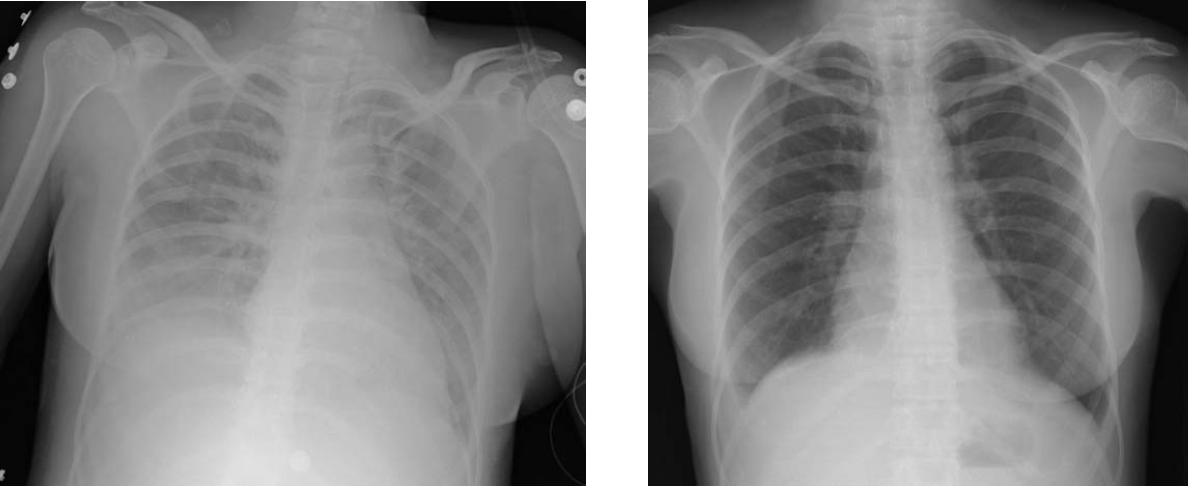
Chest X-ray of transfusion-related acute lung injury (TRALI) compared to chest X-ray of the same person after treatment

TRALI is defined as an acute lung injury that is temporally related to a blood transfusion; specifically, it occurs within the first six hours following a transfusion.

It is typically associated with plasma components such as platelets and fresh frozen plasma, though cases have been reported with packed red blood cells since there is some residual plasma in the packed cells. Incidents have also been reported with other blood products including "cryoprecipitate, granulocytes, intravenous immune globulin, allogeneic and autologous stem cells".

It is a diagnosis upon examination of clinical manifestations that appear within 6 hours of transfusion, such as acute respiratory distress, tachypnea, hypotension, cyanosis, and dyspnea. TRALI is an uncommon syndrome, that is due to the presence of leukocyte antibodies in transfused plasma. It is believed to occur in approximately one in every 5000 transfusions. Leukoagglutination and pooling of granulocytes in the recipient's lungs may occur, with release of the contents of leukocyte granules, and resulting injury to cellular membranes, endothelial surfaces, and potentially to lung parenchyma. In most cases, leukoagglutination results in mild dyspnea and pulmonary infiltrates within about 6 hours of transfusion, and spontaneously resolves.

Occasionally more severe lung injury occurs as a result of this phenomenon and acute respiratory distress syndrome (ARDS) results. Leukocyte filters may prevent TRALI for those patients whose lung injury is due to leukoagglutination of the donor white blood cells, but because most TRALI is due to donor antibodies to leukocytes, filters are not helpful in TRALI prevention. Transfused plasma (from any component source) may also contain antibodies that cross-react with platelets in the recipient, producing usually mild forms of posttransfusion purpura or platelet aggregation after transfusion.

Another nonspecific form of immunologic transfusion complication is mild to moderate immunosuppression consequent to transfusion. This effect of transfusion is not completely understood, but appears to be more common with cellular transfusion and may result in both desirable and undesirable effects. Mild immunosuppression may benefit organ transplant recipients and patients with autoimmune diseases; however, neonates and other already immunosuppressed hosts may be more vulnerable to infection, and cancer patients may possibly have worse outcomes postoperatively.

== Treatment ==
The mainstay of therapy in TRALI is supportive care. Oxygen supplementation is employed in all reported cases of TRALI, and 72% of patients require aggressive respiratory support. To support blood pressure, intravenous administration of fluids, as well as vasopressors, are essential. In treating TRALI, diuretics are to be avoided, although they are indicated in the management of transfusion associated circulatory overload. Corticosteroids can be beneficial.

== Epidemiology ==
The true incidence of TRALI is unknown because of the difficulty in making the diagnosis and because of underreporting. It is estimated to occur in 1:1300 to 1:5000 transfusions of plasma-containing products. TRALI is the leading reported cause of death related to transfusion in the United States; more than 20 cases were reported per year from 2003 to 2005. The immune mediated form of TRALI occurs approximately once every 5000 transfusions and has a mortality of 6–9%.

== See also ==
- Flash pulmonary edema
