= ATC code B05 =

ATC code B05 Blood substitutes and perfusion solutions is a therapeutic subgroup of the Anatomical Therapeutic Chemical Classification System, a system of alphanumeric codes developed by the World Health Organization (WHO) for the classification of drugs and other medical products. Subgroup B05 is part of the anatomical group B Blood and blood forming organs.

Codes for veterinary use (ATCvet codes) can be created by placing the letter Q in front of the human ATC code: for example, QB05. ATCvet codes without corresponding human ATC codes are cited with the leading Q in the following list.
National versions of the ATC classification may include additional codes not present in this list, which follows the WHO version.

== B05A Blood and related products ==
=== B05AA Blood substitutes and plasma protein fractions ===
B05AA01 Serum albumin
B05AA02 Other plasma protein fractions
B05AA03 Fluorocarbon blood substitutes
B05AA05 Dextran
B05AA06 Gelatin agents
B05AA07 Hydroxyethylstarch
B05AA08 Hemoglobin crosfumaril
B05AA09 Hemoglobin raffimer
B05AA10 Hemoglobin glutamer (bovine)
QB05AA91 Hemoglobin betafumaril (bovine)

=== B05AX Other blood products ===
B05AX01 Erythrocytes
B05AX02 Thrombocytes
B05AX03 Blood plasma
B05AX04 Stem cells from umbilical cord blood

== B05B I.V. solutions ==
=== B05BA Solutions for parenteral nutrition ===
B05BA01 Amino acids
B05BA02 Fat emulsions
B05BA03 Carbohydrates
B05BA04 Protein hydrolysates
B05BA10 Combinations

=== B05BB Solutions affecting the electrolyte balance ===
B05BB01 Electrolytes
B05BB02 Electrolytes with carbohydrates
B05BB03 Trometamol
B05BB04 Electrolytes in combination with other drugs

=== B05BC Solutions producing osmotic diuresis ===
B05BC01 Mannitol
B05BC02 Carbamide

== B05C Irrigating solutions ==
=== B05CA Antiinfectives ===
B05CA01 Cetylpyridinium
B05CA02 Chlorhexidine
B05CA03 Nitrofural
B05CA04 Sulfamethizole
B05CA05 Taurolidine
B05CA06 Mandelic acid
B05CA07 Noxytiolin
B05CA08 Ethacridine lactate
B05CA09 Neomycin
B05CA10 Combinations

=== B05CB Salt solutions ===
B05CB01 Sodium chloride
B05CB02 Sodium citrate
B05CB03 Magnesium citrate
B05CB04 Sodium bicarbonate
B05CB10 Combinations

=== B05CX Other irrigating solutions ===
B05CX01 Glucose
B05CX02 Sorbitol
B05CX03 Glycine
B05CX04 Mannitol
B05CX10 Combinations

== B05D Peritoneal dialytics ==
=== B05DA Isotonic solutions ===
Empty group

=== B05DB Hypertonic solutions ===
Empty group

== B05X I.V. solution additives ==
Empty group

=== B05XA Electrolyte solutions ===
B05XA01 Potassium chloride
B05XA02 Sodium bicarbonate
B05XA03 Sodium chloride
B05XA04 Ammonium chloride
B05XA05 Magnesium sulfate
B05XA06 Potassium phosphate, including combinations with other potassium salts
B05XA07 Calcium chloride
B05XA08 Sodium acetate
B05XA09 Sodium phosphate
B05XA10 Magnesium phosphate
B05XA11 Magnesium chloride
B05XA12 Zinc chloride
B05XA13 Hydrochloric acid
B05XA14 Sodium glycerophosphate
B05XA15 Potassium lactate
B05XA16 Cardioplegia solutions
B05XA17 Potassium acetate
B05XA18 Zinc sulfate
B05XA19 Calcium gluconate
B05XA20 Sodium selenite
B05XA30 Combinations of electrolytes
B05XA31 Electrolytes in combination with other drugs

=== B05XB Amino acids ===
B05XB01 Arginine hydrochloride
B05XB02 Alanyl glutamine
B05XB03 Lysine

=== B05XC Vitamins ===
Empty group

=== B05XX Other i.v. solution additives ===
B05XX02 Trometamol

== B05Z Hemodialytics and hemofiltrates ==
=== B05ZA Hemodialytics, concentrates ===
Empty group

=== B05ZB Hemofiltrates ===
Empty group
