= C15H13NO4 =

The molecular formula C_{15}H_{13}NO_{4} (molar mass: 271.24 g/mol, exact mass: 271.0845 u) may refer to:

- Acetaminosalol
- Darienine
