= Delayed hemolytic transfusion reaction =

- Specialty: Hematology and immunology
- Symptoms: Drop in hemoglobin level, fever, jaundice, or hemoglobinuria, as well as chills, abdominal pain, or back pain
- Usual onset: Generally up to one month
- Causes: Transfusion of mismatched blood types, reactivity of recipient's antibodies against donor's red blood cell proteins, or prior damage to red blood cells contained in transfusion products
- Risk factors: Medical malpractice, inadequate compatibility testing for blood transfusions, and negligent handling of blood products
- Diagnostic method: Antiglobulin test, also known as a Coombs test
- Differential diagnosis: Acute hemolytic transfusion reaction Transfusion-related acute lung injury Febrile non-hemolytic transfusion reaction Transfusion-associated graft versus host disease Hyperhemolysis

This page is currently under construction.

A delayed hemolytic transfusion reaction (DHTR) is a type of adverse reaction to a blood transfusion. DHTR is the later-onset manifestation of hemolytic transfusion reaction, which may also present as acute hemolytic transfusion reaction (AHTR) in a shorter timeframe from transfusion administration. The prevalence of AHTR has been estimated at 1 in 70,000 blood transfusions, whereas the prevalence of DHTR is thought to be underreported, although various studies estimate the prevalence of DHTR as between 1 in 800, to 1 in 11,000 transfusions.

Hemolytic transfusion reactions are a possible complication from red blood cell transfusions. Hemolysis refers to the lysis (rupture) of red blood cells, and the resulting leakage of their contents. Hemolytic reactions may be immune or non-immune mediated. Immune-mediated hemolytic reactions, such as DHTR, represent a type of alloimmunity. Non-immune hemolysis may result from thermal, osmotic, or mechanical damage to red blood cells in transfusion products.

In immune-mediated DHTR, the transfusion recipient has antibodies that react with antigens on incompatible donor red blood cells, prompting lysis of the red blood cells by the recipient's immune cells, such as macrophages. The severity of immune-mediated hemolytic reactions may vary based on the type and quantity of both the transfused red blood cell antigens and the recipient's antibodies against them, as well as the ability of the antibodies to activate complement or opsonization. Some recipients do not have significant pre-existing antibodies against transfused red blood cells, but then develop higher levels of such antibodies following immune stimulation by the transfused red blood cells.

While AHTR usually presents within the first 24 hours after transfusion, DHTR has the possibility to present up to 30 days later. Even though DHTR may have a lower chance of severe outcomes than AHTR, it can still be fatal or result in serious complications, and must be treated as an urgent medical issue.

== Mechanism ==
If a person without a Kidd blood antigen (for example a Jka-Jkb+ patient) receives a Kidd antigen (Jka-antigen for example) in a red blood cell transfusion and forms an alloantibody (anti-Jka); upon subsequent transfusion with Jka-antigen positive red blood cells, the patient may have a delayed hemolytic transfusion reaction as their anti-Jka antibody hemolyzes the transfused Jka-antigen positive red blood cells. Other common blood groups with this reaction are Duffy, Rhesus and Kell.

Immune-mediated hemolytic reactions may be classified as either intravascular or extravascular hemolysis. Intravascular hemolysis takes place while the red blood cells are still when the recipient's antibodies bind to the donor's red blood cells and cause complement activation. Extravascular hemolysis is produced when the recipient's antibodies opsonize the donor's red blood cells, leading to their sequestration and phagocytosis by phagocyte immune cells such as macrophages. Macrophage activation, in response to antibody-mediated targeting of red blood cells, can also increase production of cytokines that induce a systemic response that results in clinical symptoms, such as fever, chills, abdominal pain, and back pain.

Some hemolytic reactions are the product of incompatibility between different blood types of the ABO blood group system. Hemolytic reactions may also be caused by incompatibilities with Rh factors, Duffy antigens, Kell antigens, Kidd antigens, and Lewis antigens.

Many people have antibodies to red blood cell antigens not found on the surface of their own red blood cells. Therefore, to use the ABO types as an example, those with type O blood are likely to have antibodies to type A and type B blood. Those with type A blood are likely to have antibodies to type B blood, and vice versa.

Antibodies against Kidd antigens may be difficult to detect because of significant variability in their molecular features, and weak in vitro expression. They have been reported to cause severe immediate or delayed hemolytic transfusion reactions, with anti-Jk antibodies responsible for 13 of 44 cases of DHTR reported in the UK during 2021.

== Diagnosis ==
- Positive elution test with alloantibodies present on the transfused red blood cells OR newly identified red blood cell alloantibodies in recipient serum.
  Antibody elution is the process of removing antibodies from the surface of red blood cells. Techniques include using heat, ultrasound, acids or organic solvents. No single method is best in all situations. In an elution test, the eluted antibodies are subsequently tested against a panel of reagent red blood cells of known phenotype.
- Inadequate rise of post-transfusion hemoglobin level OR rapid fall in hemoglobin level back to pre-transfusion levels OR otherwise unexplained appearance of spherocytes.
- Newly identified red blood cell alloantibody demonstrated between 24 hours and 28 days after cessation of transfusion BUT incomplete laboratory evidence to meet definitive case definition criteria.

Symptoms may include a drop in hemoglobin level, fever, jaundice, or hemoglobinuria. It is also "associated with a fall in Hb or failure to increment, rise in bilirubin and LDH and an incompatible crossmatch not detectable pre transfusion."

DHTR may be diagnosed by the presence of antibodies that react to red blood cells. An antiglobulin test, also known as a Coombs test, is a type of blood test used in immunohematology. An antiglobulin test may either be direct (e.g., "direct antiglobulin test" or "direct Coombs test"), or indirect. The direct test is designed to detect antibodies already bound to the surface of red blood cells in a clinical blood sample. By contrast, the indirect test is designed to detect antibodies that are freely floating in the blood, and that display in vitro reactivity against red blood cells. Both direct and indirect Coombs tests may be useful for investigating suspected blood transfusion reactions. The indirect test may also be used to determine a patient's reactivity to foreign red blood cell antigens prior to transfusion.

Hyperhemolysis differs from DHTR in that it involves the lysis of the recipient's own red blood cells in addition to those introduced from the donor.

== Epidemiology ==
Delayed blood transfusion reactions occur at an incidence of about 1/500 to 1/10,000 transfusions in the United States. The subacute presentation, milder symptoms and paucity of reporting data make determination of the true incidence difficult.
