= Blood transfusion =

Intravenous transference of blood products

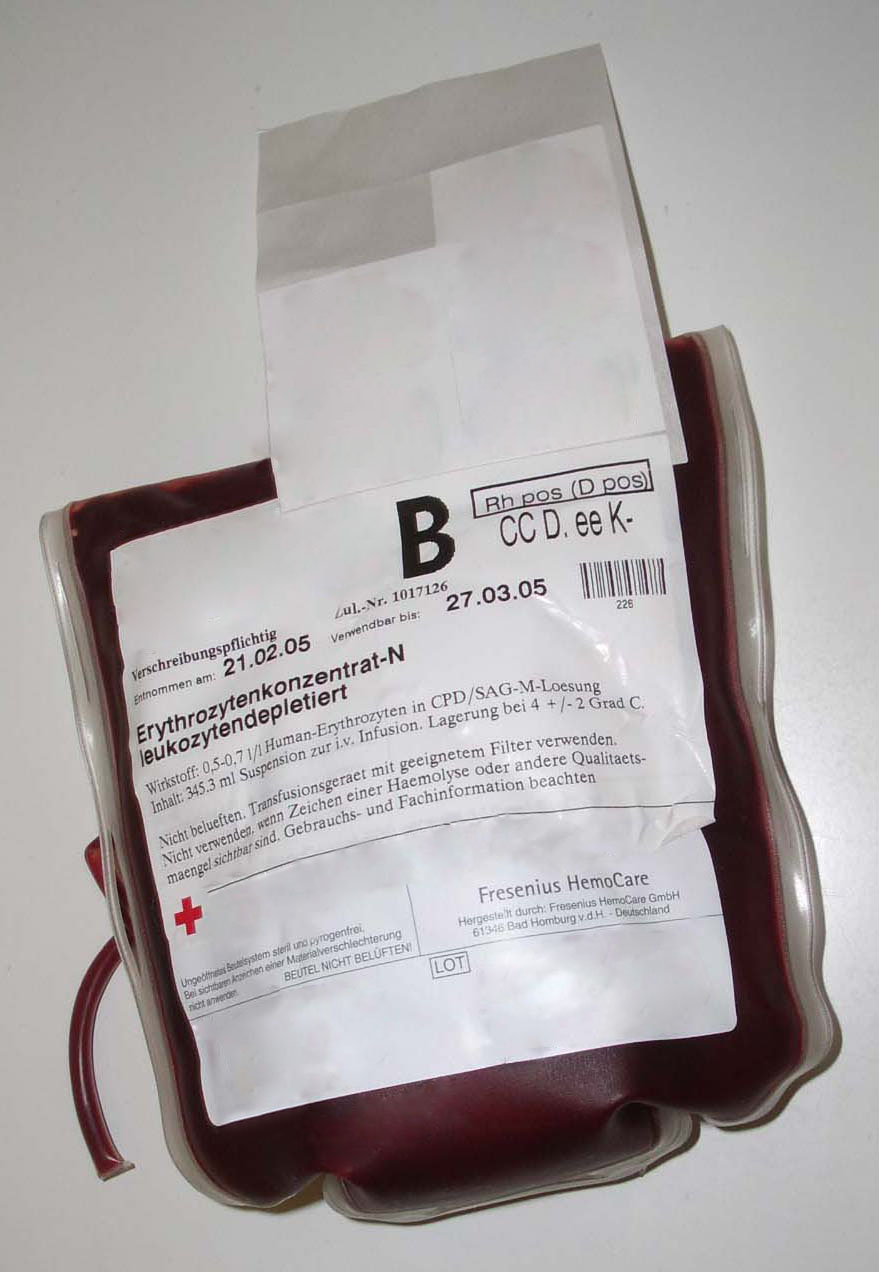
- Plastic bag with 0.5–0.7 liters containing packed red blood cells in citrate, phosphate, dextrose, and adenine (CPDA) solution
- ICD-9-CM: 99.0
- MeSH: D001803
- OPS-301 code: 8-80
- MedlinePlus: 000431

Blood transfusion refers to the intravenous transfer of blood products into a human or other animal. Apart from the setting of major trauma, whole blood is rarely transfused in modern practice. Instead, only components of the blood, such as red blood cells, plasma, platelets, and other clotting factors are transfused. White blood cells are not commonly transfused, since granulocyte transfusion has limited applications.

== Medical uses ==
=== Red cell transfusion ===
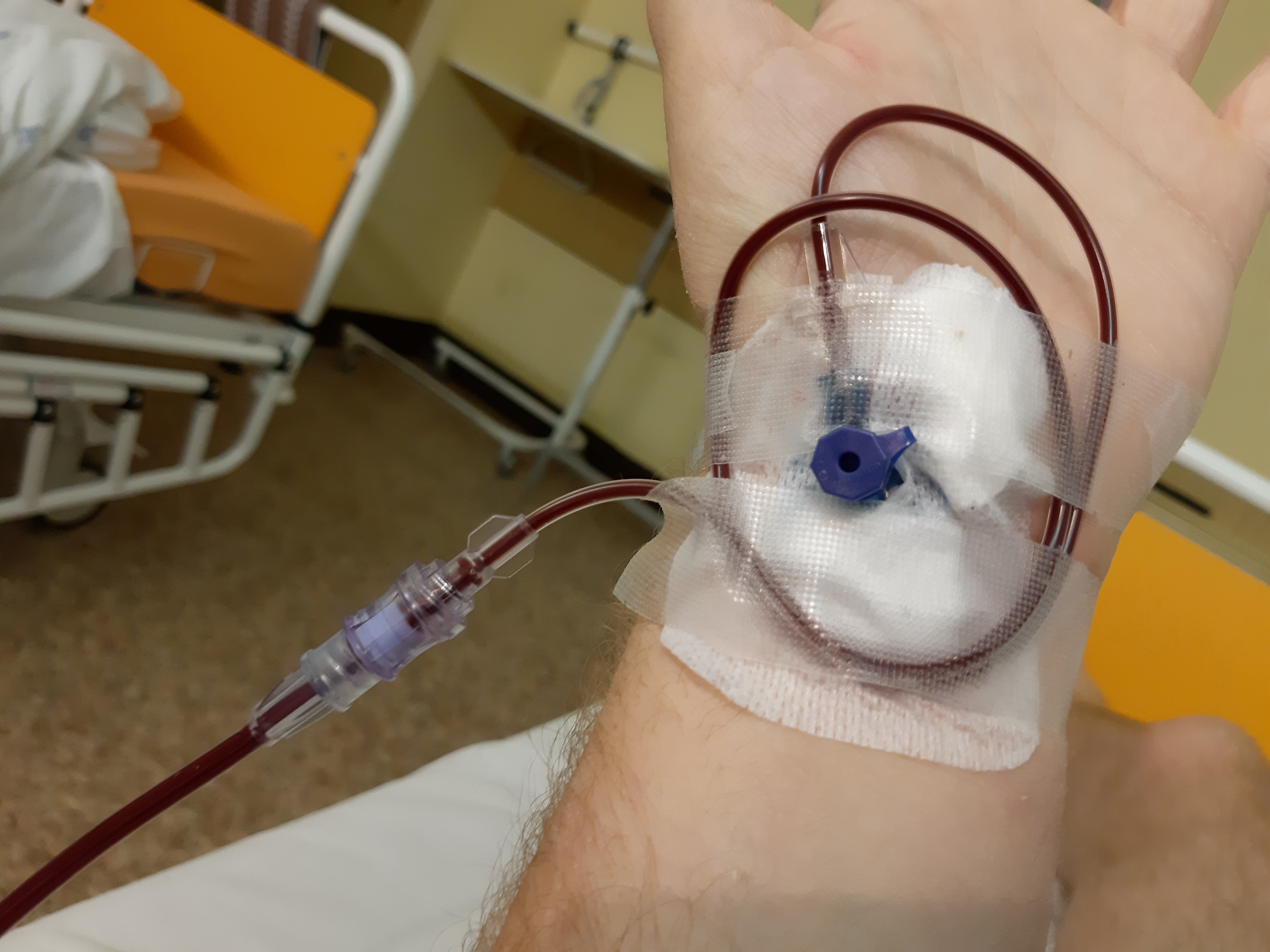
A person receiving a blood transfusion

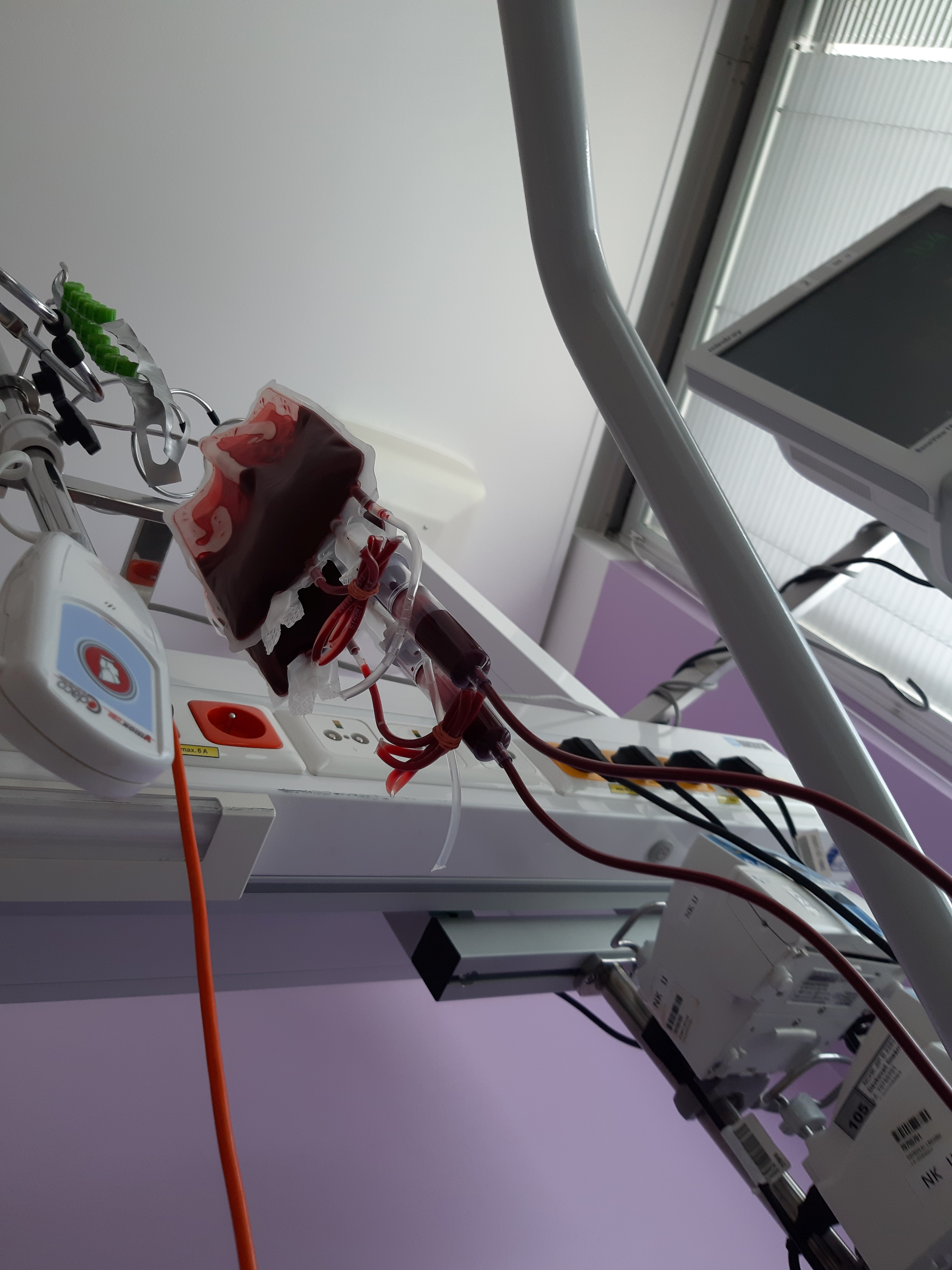
Banked blood during the blood transfusion process

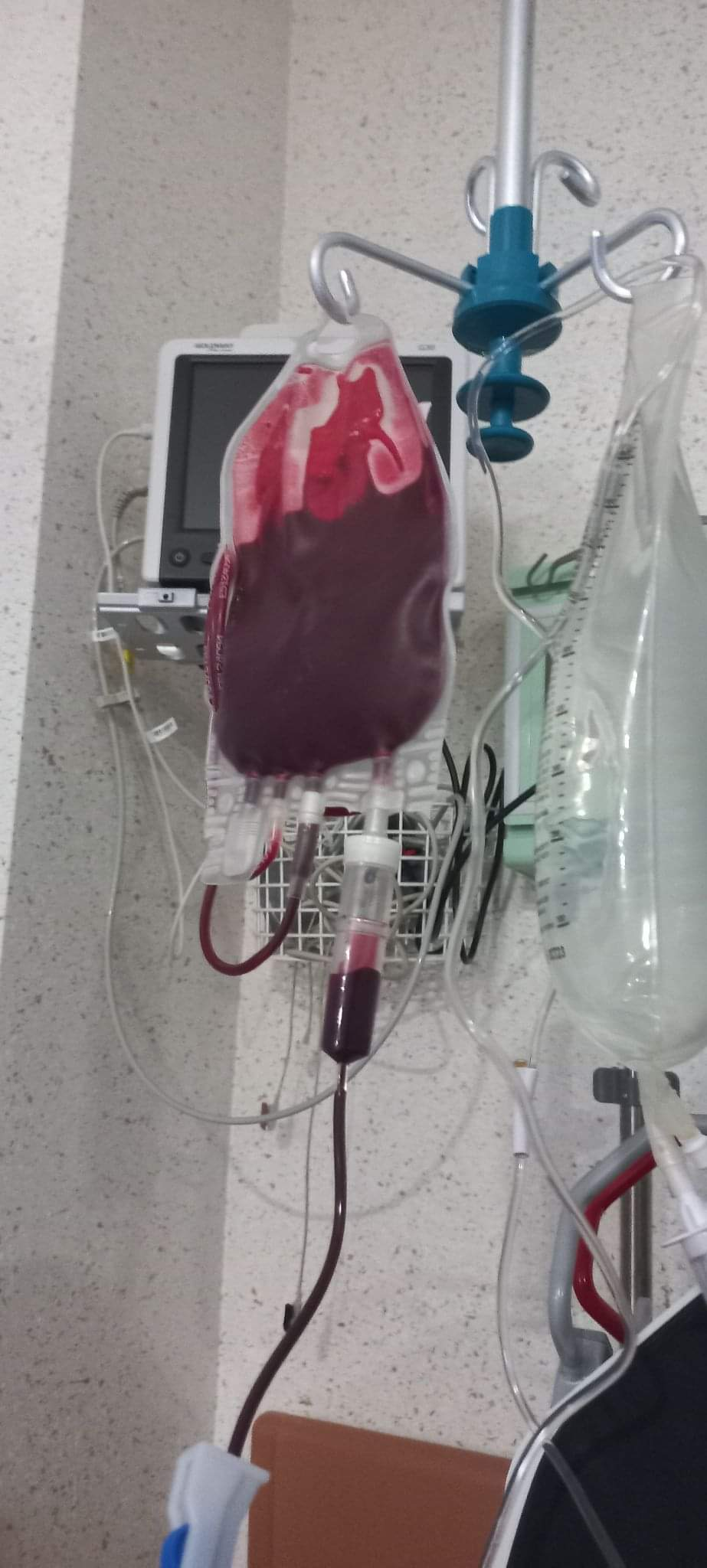
A blood transfusion; the bag slowly empties, leaving behind blood that has clotted before it could be administered.

Red blood cell transfusion may be considered when the hemoglobin concentration or the hematocrit falls below a certain point. In cases where people have low levels of hemoglobin due to iron deficiency but are otherwise stable, iron supplementation may be indicated.

== Procedure ==
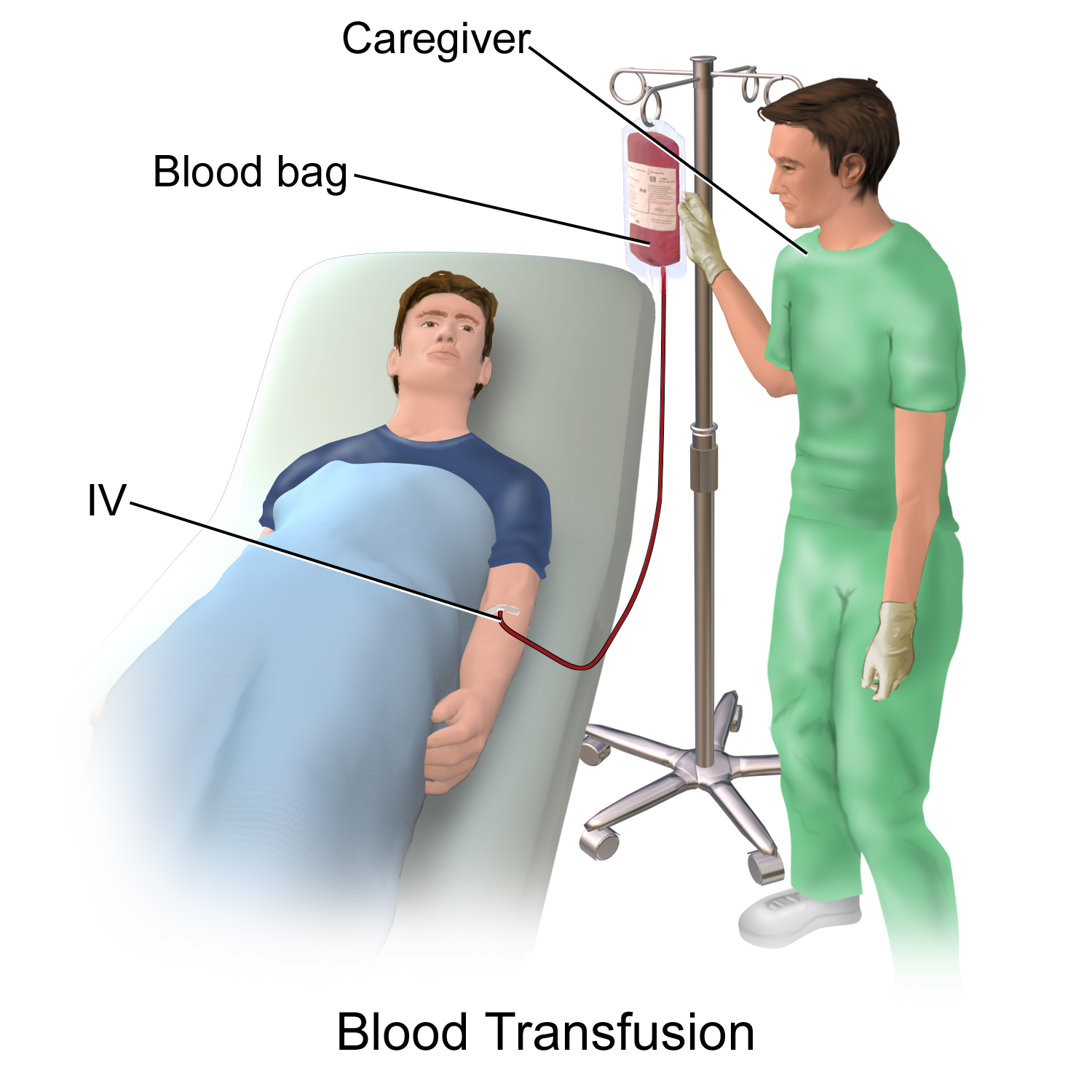
Illustration depicting intravenous blood transfusion

As of 2023, 71% of countries had specific legislation addressing the safety and quality of blood transfusion.

=== Blood donation ===
The source of blood to be transfused can either be the potential recipient (autologous transfusion) or someone else (allogeneic or homologous transfusion). The latter is much more common than the former. Using another's blood must first start with the donation of blood. Blood is most commonly donated as whole blood obtained intravenously and mixed with an anticoagulant. In first-world countries, donations are usually anonymous to the recipient, but products in a blood bank are always individually traceable through the whole cycle of donation, testing, separation into components, storage, and administration to the recipient. This enables management and investigation of any suspected transfusion-related disease transmission or transfusion reaction. Developing countries rely heavily on replacement and remunerated donors rather than voluntary nonremunerated donors due to concerns regarding donation- and transfusion-transmitted infection as well as local and cultural beliefs.

It is unclear whether applying an alcohol swab alone or an alcohol swab followed by an antiseptic can reduce contamination of the donor's blood.

Studies show that the main motivators to blood donation tend to be prosocial (e.g., altruism, selflessness, charity), while the main deterrents include fear, distrust, or perceived racial discrimination in historic contexts.

=== Processing and testing ===
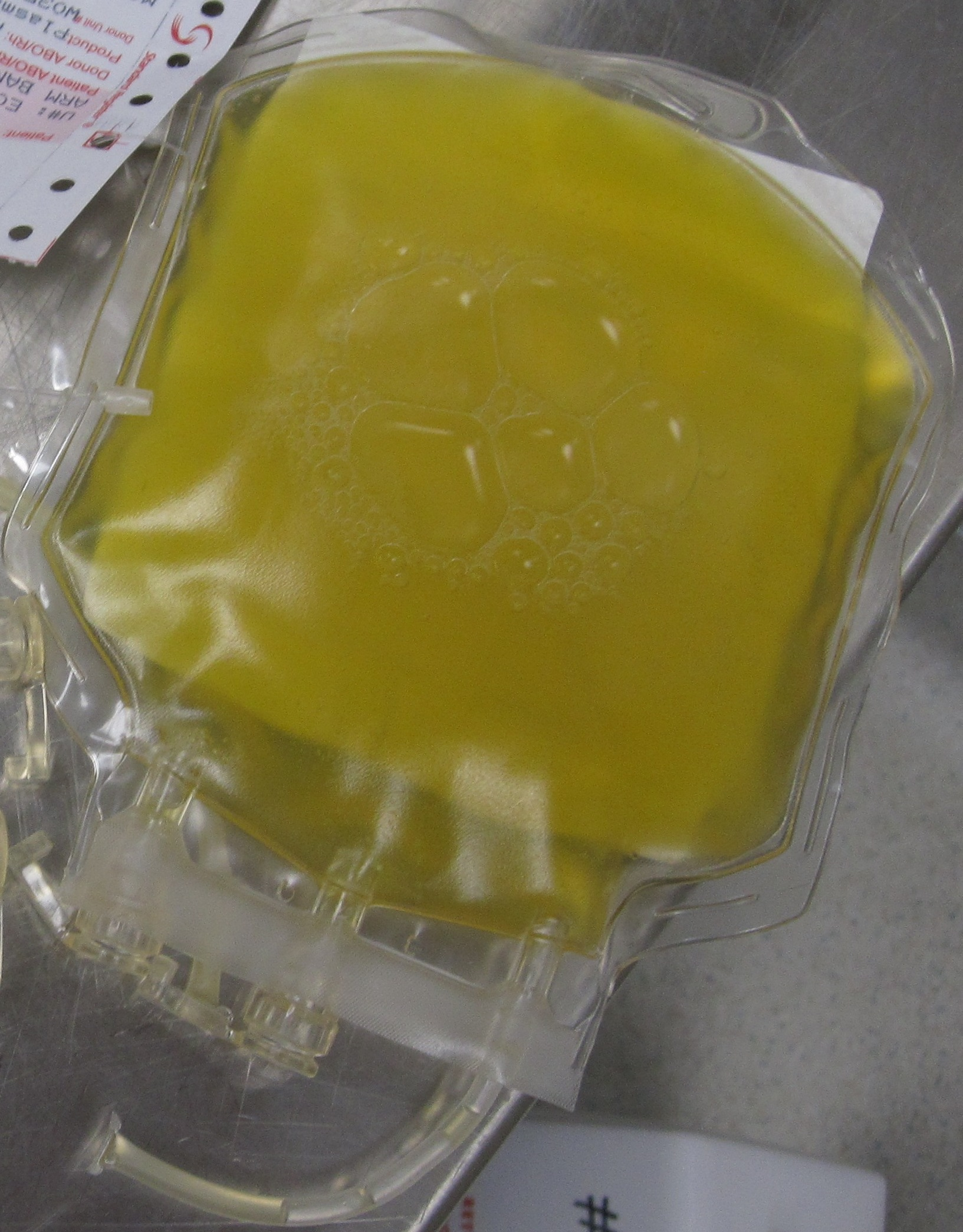
A bag containing one unit of fresh frozen plasma

Donated blood is usually processed after collection to make it suitable for use in specific patient populations. Collected blood is then separated into blood components by centrifugation: red blood cells, plasma, and platelets. Plasma can be further processed to manufacture albumin protein, clotting factor concentrates, cryoprecipitate, fibrinogen concentrate, and immunoglobulins (antibodies). Red cells, plasma, and platelets can also be donated individually via a more complex process called apheresis.

Different blood components require specific storage conditions: red blood cells are typically stored at 1–6 °C, platelets at 20–24 °C with continuous agitation, and plasma is stored frozen at −18 °C or lower to preserve clotting factors.

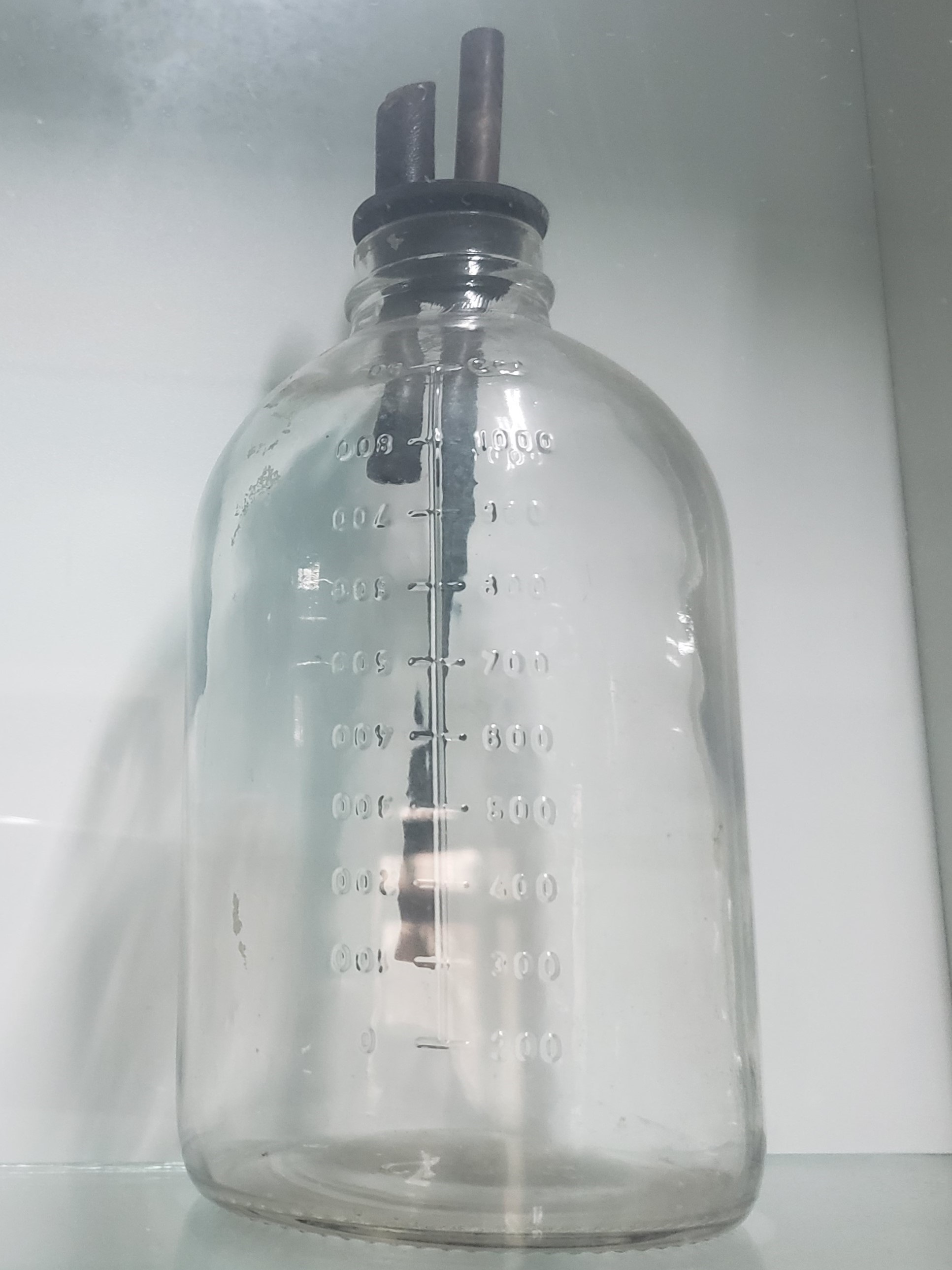
- Glass used in an antiquated method of blood transfusion
  The World Health Organization (WHO) recommends that all donated blood be tested for transfusion-transmissible infections. These include HIV, hepatitis B, hepatitis C, Treponema pallidum (syphilis) and, where relevant, other infections that pose a risk to the safety of the blood supply, such as Trypanosoma cruzi (Chagas disease) and Plasmodium species (malaria). According to the WHO, 10 countries are not able to screen all donated blood for one or more of: HIV, hepatitis B, hepatitis C, or syphilis. One of the main reasons for this is that testing kits are not always available. However, the prevalence of transfusion-transmitted infections is much higher in low-income countries compared to middle and high-income countries.
- All donated blood should also be tested for the ABO blood group system and Rh blood group system to ensure that the patient is receiving compatible blood.
- In addition, in some countries, platelet products are also tested for bacterial infections due to their higher inclination for contamination due to storage at room temperature.
- Donors may be tested for cytomegalovirus (CMV) because of the risk of transmission to certain immunocompromised recipients, such as those with stem cell transplant or T cell diseases. However, testing is not universally mandated, because leukoreduced blood is generally considered safe from CMV transmission; also, most donors (and recipients) are seropositive for CMV, and are not actively viremic. CMV seropositive donors are still eligible to donate.
- Leukocyte reduction is the removal of white blood cells by filtration. Leukoreduced blood products are less likely to cause HLA alloimmunization (development of antibodies against specific blood types), febrile non-hemolytic transfusion reaction, cytomegalovirus infection, and platelet-transfusion refractoriness. Leukoreduction is performed using specialized filtration systems during blood processing, and in many countries it is routinely applied to most blood products before storage to reduce the risk of transfusion reactions and transmission of certain infections.
- Pathogen reduction treatment that involves, for example, the addition of riboflavin with subsequent exposure to UV light has been shown to be effective in inactivating pathogens (viruses, bacteria, parasites and white blood cells) in blood products. By inactivating white blood cells in donated blood products, riboflavin and UV light treatment can also replace gamma-irradiation as a method to prevent graft-versus-host disease (TA-GvHD).

=== Compatibility testing ===
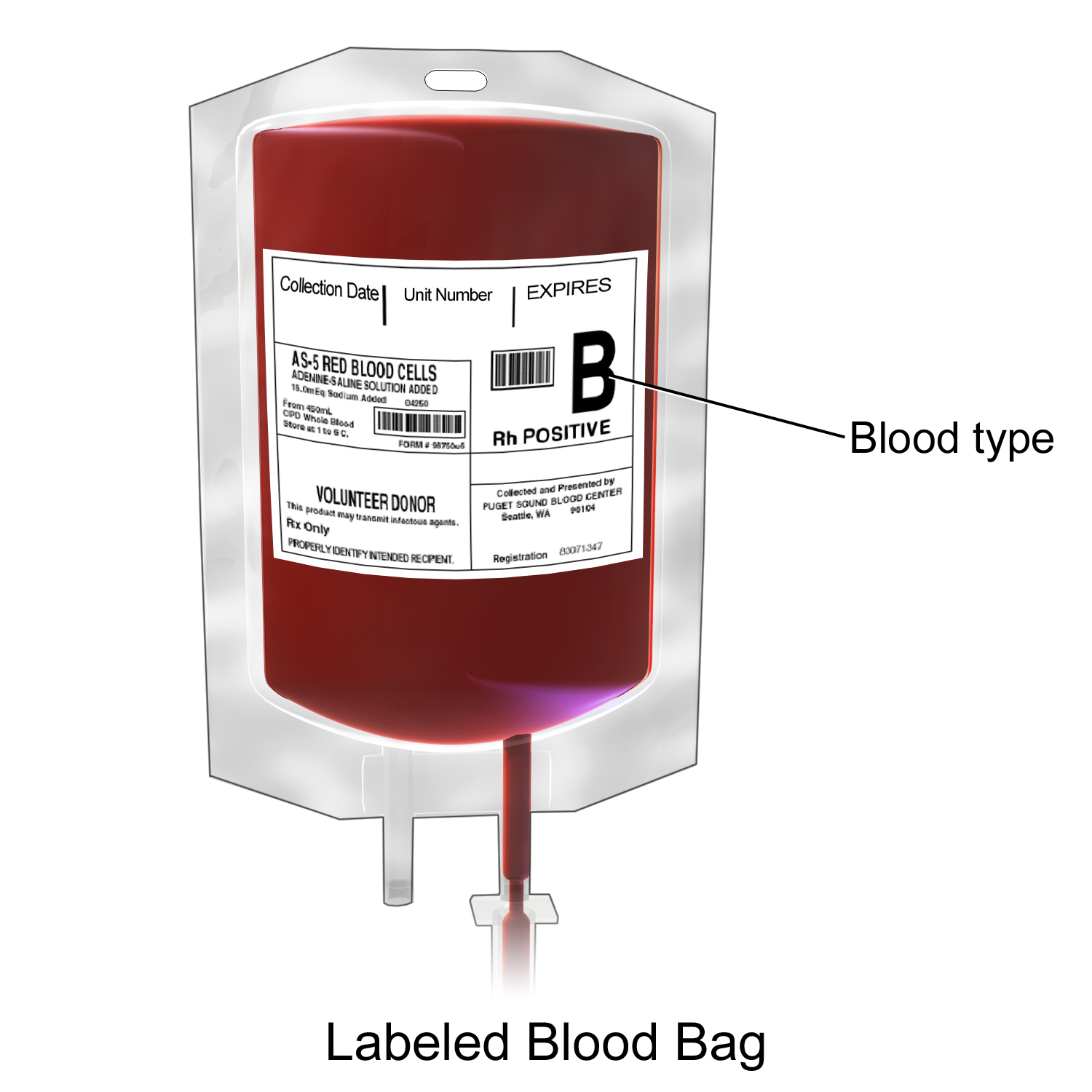
Illustration of labeled blood bag

Before a recipient receives a transfusion, compatibility testing between donor and recipient blood must be done. The first step before a transfusion is given is to type and screen the recipient's blood. Typing of recipient's blood determines the ABO and Rh status. The sample is then screened for any alloantibodies that may react with donor blood. It takes about 45 minutes to complete (depending on the method used). The blood bank scientist also checks for special requirements of the patient (e.g. need for washed, irradiated or CMV negative blood) and the history of the patient to see if they have previously identified antibodies and any other serological anomalies.

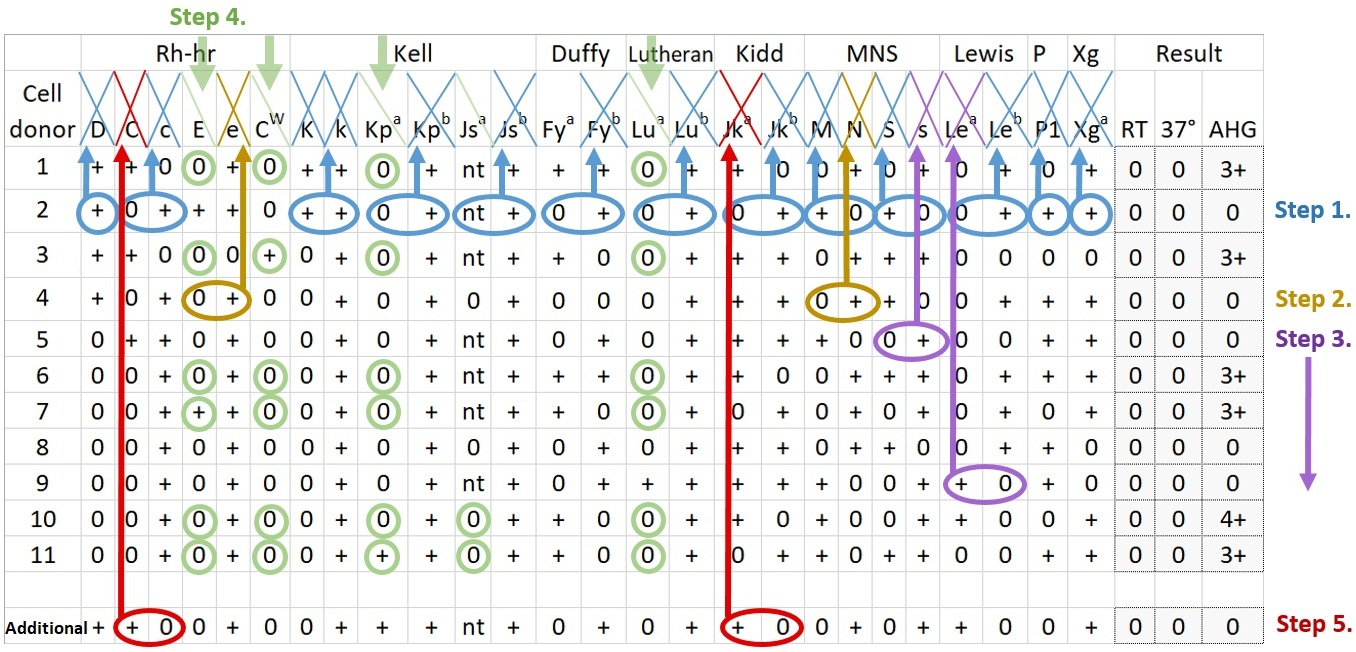
Interpretation of antibody panel to detect patient antibodies towards the most relevant human blood group systems

A positive screen warrants an antibody panel/investigation to determine if it is clinically significant. An antibody panel consists of commercially prepared group O red cell suspensions from donors that have been phenotyped for antigens that correspond to commonly encountered and clinically significant alloantibodies. Donor cells may have homozygous (e.g. K+k+), heterozygous (K+k-) expression or no expression of various antigens (K−k−). The phenotypes of all the donor cells being tested are shown in a chart. The patient's serum is tested against the various donor cells using an indirect Coombs test. Based on the reactions of the patient's serum against the donor cells, a pattern will emerge to confirm the presence of one or more antibodies. Not all antibodies are clinically significant (i.e. cause transfusion reactions, HDN, etc.). Once the patient has developed a clinically significant antibody it is vital that the patient receive antigen-negative red blood cells to prevent future transfusion reactions.

If there is no antibody present, an immediate spin crossmatch may be performed where the recipient serum and donor rbc are incubated. In the immediate spin method, two drops of patient serum are tested against a drop of 3–5% suspension of donor cells in a test tube and spun in a serofuge. Agglutination or hemolysis (i.e., positive Coombs test) in the test tube is a positive reaction. If the crossmatch is positive, then further investigation is needed. Patients with no history of red cell antibodies may qualify for computer-assisted crossmatch, which does not involve combining patient serum with donor cells.

If an antibody is suspected, potential donor units must first be screened for the corresponding antigen by phenotyping them. Antigen negative units are then tested against the patient plasma using an antiglobulin/indirect crossmatch technique at 37 degrees Celsius to enhance reactivity and make the test easier to read.

In urgent cases where crossmatching cannot be completed, and the risk of dropping hemoglobin outweighs the risk of transfusing uncrossmatched blood, O-negative blood is used, followed by crossmatch as soon as possible. O-negative is also used for children and women of childbearing age. It is preferable for the laboratory to obtain a pre-transfusion sample in these cases so a type and screen can be performed to determine the actual blood group of the patient and to check for alloantibodies.

==== Compatibility of ABO and Rh system for Red Cell (Erythrocyte) Transfusion ====
This chart shows possible matches in blood transfusion between donor and receiver using ABO and Rh system. The symbol indicates compatibility.

| | | Donor | | | | | | | |
| | | O− | O+ | B− | B+ | A− | A+ | AB− | AB+ |
|---|---|---|---|---|---|---|---|---|---|
| Recipient | AB+ | | | | | | | | |
| Recipient | AB− | | | | | | | | |
| Recipient | A+ | | | | | | | | |
| Recipient | A− | | | | | | | | |
| Recipient | B+ | | | | | | | | |
| Recipient | B− | | | | | | | | |
| Recipient | O+ | | | | | | | | |
| Recipient | O− | | | | | | | | |

Agglutination (clumping) of red blood cells due to an incorrect transfusion

== Adverse effects ==
In the same way that the safety of pharmaceutical products is overseen by pharmacovigilance, the safety of blood and blood products is overseen by haemovigilance. This is defined by the World Health Organization (WHO) as a system "...to identify and prevent occurrence or recurrence of transfusion related unwanted events, to increase the safety, efficacy and efficiency of blood transfusion, covering all activities of the transfusion chain from donor to recipient." The system should include monitoring, identification, reporting, investigation and analysis of adverse events, near-misses, and reactions related to transfusion and manufacturing. In the UK this data is collected by an independent organisation called SHOT (Serious Hazards Of Transfusion). Haemovigilance systems have been established in many countries with the objective of ensuring the safety of blood for transfusion, but their organisational set-up and operating principles can vary.

Transfusions of blood products are associated with several complications, many of which can be grouped as immunological or infectious. There is controversy on potential quality degradation during storage.

=== Immunologic reaction ===
- Acute hemolytic reactions are defined according to Serious Hazards of Transfusion (SHOT) as "fever and other symptoms/signs of haemolysis within 24 hours of transfusion; confirmed by one or more of the following: a fall of Hb, rise in lactate dehydrogenase (LDH), positive direct antiglobulin test (DAT), positive crossmatch" This is due to destruction of donor red blood cells by preformed recipient antibodies. Most often this occurs because of clerical errors or improper ABO blood typing and crossmatching resulting in a mismatch in ABO blood type between the donor and the recipient. Symptoms include fever, chills, chest pain, back pain, hemorrhage, increased heart rate, shortness of breath, and rapid drop in blood pressure. When suspected, transfusion should be stopped immediately, and blood sent for tests to evaluate for presence of hemolysis. Treatment is supportive. Kidney injury may occur because of the effects of the hemolytic reaction (pigment nephropathy). The severity of the transfusion reaction is depended upon amount of donor's antigen transfused, nature of the donor's antigens, the nature and the amount of recipient antibodies.
- Delayed hemolytic reactions occur more than 24 hours after a transfusion. They usually occur within 28 days of a transfusion. They can be due to either a low level of antibodies present prior to the start of the transfusion, which are not detectable on pre-transfusion testing; or development of a new antibody against an antigen in the transfused blood. Therefore, delayed haemolytic reaction does not manifest until after 24 hours when enough antibodies are available to cause a reaction. The red blood cells are removed by macrophages from the blood circulation into liver and spleen to be destroyed, which leads to extravascular haemolysis. This process usually mediated by anti-Rh and anti-Kidd antibodies. However, this type of transfusion reaction is less severe when compared to acute haemolytic transfusion reaction.
- Febrile nonhemolytic reactions are, along with allergic transfusion reactions, the most common type of blood transfusion reaction and occur because of the release of inflammatory chemical signals released by white blood cells in stored donor blood or attack on donor's white blood cells by recipient's antibodies. This type of reaction occurs in about 7% of transfusions. Fever is generally short lived and is treated with antipyretics, and transfusions may be finished as long as an acute hemolytic reaction is excluded. This is a reason for the now-widespread use of leukoreduction – the filtration of donor white cells from red cell product units.
- Allergic transfusion reactions are caused by IgE anti-allergen antibodies. When antibodies are bound to its antigens, histamine is released from mast cells and basophils. Either IgE antibodies from the donor's or recipient's side can cause the allergic reaction. It is more common in patients who have allergic conditions such as hay fever. Patient may feel itchy or having hives but the symptoms are usually mild and can be controlled by stopping the transfusion and giving antihistamines.
- Anaphylactic reactions are rare life-threatening allergic conditions caused by IgA anti-plasma protein antibodies. For patients who have selective immunoglobulin A deficiency, the reaction is presumed to be caused by IgA antibodies in the donor's plasma. The patient may present with symptoms of fever, wheezing, coughing, shortness of breath, and circulatory shock. Urgent treatment with epinephrine is needed.
- Post-transfusion purpura is an extremely rare complication that occurs after blood product transfusion and is associated with the presence of antibodies in the patient's blood directed against both the donor's and recipient's platelets HPA (human platelet antigen). Recipients who lack this protein develop sensitization to this protein from prior transfusions or previous pregnancies, can develop thrombocytopenia, bleeding into the skin, and can display purplish discolouration of skin which is known as purpura. Intravenous immunoglobulin (IVIG) is treatment of choice.
- Transfusion-related acute lung injury (TRALI) is a syndrome that is similar to acute respiratory distress syndrome (ARDS), which develops during or within 6 hours of transfusion of a plasma-containing blood product. Fever, hypotension, shortness of breath, and tachycardia often occurs in this type of reaction. For a definitive diagnosis to be made, symptoms must occur within 6 hours of transfusion, hypoxemia must be present, there must be radiographic evidence of bilateral infiltrates and there must be no evidence of left atrial hypertension (fluid overload). It occurs in 15% of the transfused patient with mortality rate of 5 to 10%. Recipient risk factors includes: end-stage liver disease, sepsis, haematological malignancies, and ventilated patients. Antibodies to human neutrophil antigens (HNA) and human leukocyte antigens (HLA) have been associated with this type of transfusion reaction. Donor's antibodies interacting with antigen positive recipient tissue result in release of inflammatory cytokines, resulting in pulmonary capillary leakage. The treatment is supportive.
- Transfusion associated circulatory overload (TACO) is a common, yet underdiagnosed, reaction to blood product transfusion consisting of the new onset or exacerbation of three of the following within 6 hours of cessation of transfusion: acute respiratory distress, elevated brain natriuretic peptide (BNP), elevated central venous pressure (CVP), evidence of left heart failure, evidence of positive fluid balance, and/or radiographic evidence of pulmonary vascular congestion. Patients with congestive heart failure or kidney disease are more susceptible to volume overload. For especially vulnerable patients, a standard RBC unit could be split by sterile technique in the blood bank and administered over 8 hours instead of the standard 4 hours. Plasma transfusion is especially prone to causing TACO because large volumes are usually required to give any therapeutic benefit.
- Transfusion-associated graft versus host disease frequently occurs in immunodeficient patients where recipient's body failed to eliminate donor's T cells. Instead, donor's T cells attack the recipient's cells. It occurs one week after transfusion. Fever, rash, diarrhoea are often associated with this type of transfusion reaction. Mortality rate is high, with 89.7% of the patients dead after 24 days. Immunosuppressive treatment is the most common way of treatment. Irradiation and leukoreduction of blood products is necessary for high risk patients to prevent T cells from attacking recipient cells.

=== Infection ===
The use of greater amount of red blood cells has been suggested to increase the risk of infections, not only transfusion-transmitted infections, but also due to a phenomenon known as transfusion-related immunomodulation (TRIM). TRIM may be caused by macrophages and their byproducts. In those who were given red blood cells only with significant anemia ("restrictive" strategy), serious infection rates were 10.6% while in those who were given red blood at milder levels of anemia ("liberal" strategy), serious infection rates were 12.7%.

On rare occasions, blood products are contaminated with bacteria. This can result in a life-threatening infection known as transfusion-transmitted bacterial infection. The risk of severe bacterial infection is estimated, as of 2020, at about 1 in 2,500 platelet transfusions, and 1 in 2,000,000 red blood cell transfusions. Blood product contamination, while rare, is still more common than actual infection. The reason platelets are more often contaminated than other blood products is that they are stored at room temperature for short periods of time. Contamination is also more common with longer duration of storage, especially if that means more than 5 days. Sources of contaminants include the donor's blood, donor's skin, phlebotomist's skin, and containers. Contaminating organisms vary greatly, and include skin flora, gut flora, and environmental organisms. There are many strategies in place at blood donation centers and laboratories to reduce the risk of contamination. A definite diagnosis of transfusion-transmitted bacterial infection includes the identification of a positive culture in the recipient (without an alternative diagnosis) as well as the identification of the same organism in the donor blood.

Since the advent of HIV testing of donor blood in the mid/later 1980s, ex. 1985's ELISA, the transmission of HIV during transfusion has dropped dramatically. Prior testing of donor blood only included testing for antibodies to HIV. However, because of latent infection (the "window period" in which an individual is infectious, but has not had time to develop antibodies) many cases of HIV seropositive blood were missed. The development of a nucleic acid test for the HIV-1 RNA has dramatically lowered the rate of donor blood seropositivity to about 1 in 3 million units. As transmittance of HIV does not necessarily mean HIV infection, the latter could still occur at an even lower rate.

The transmission of hepatitis C via transfusion currently stands at a rate of about 1 in 2 million units. As with HIV, this low rate has been attributed to the ability to screen for both antibodies as well as viral RNA nucleic acid testing in donor blood.

Other rare transmissible infections include hepatitis B, syphilis, Chagas disease, cytomegalovirus infections (in immunocompromised recipients), HTLV, and Babesia.

=== Comparison table ===
Comparison of symptoms of blood transfusion reactions characterized by fever.
+ =Occasionally present ++ =Frequently present
| | Febrile nonhemolytic | TRALI | Acute hemolytic | Bacterial contamination |
| Appearance of symptoms during or after transfusion | Usually toward end. 5–10% appear up to 2 hours after. | Early (after 10–15 ml) | Early (after 50–100 ml) | Up to 8 hours after transfusion |
| Fever | + | ++ | ++ | ++ |
| Chills | ++ | ++ | ++ | +++ |
| Cold | ++ | - | + | - |
| Discomfort | ++ | - | - | - |
| Rigors | + | - | - | - |
| Headache | + | - | + | - |
| Nausea and/or vomiting | + | - | ++ | - |
| Dyspnea | + | ++ | ++ | - |
| Cyanosis | - | ++ | ++ | - |
| Hypotension / circulatory shock | - | ++ | ++ | ++ |
| Disseminated intravascular coagulation | - | - | ++ | ++ |
| Hemoglobinuria | - | - | ++ | + |
| Renal failure | - | - | ++ | ++ |
| Back pain | - | - | ++ | - |

=== Inefficacy ===
Transfusion inefficacy or insufficient efficacy of a given unit(s) of blood product, while not itself a "complication" per se, can nonetheless indirectly lead to complications – in addition to causing a transfusion to fully or partly fail to achieve its clinical purpose. This can be especially significant for certain patient groups such as critical-care or neonatals.

For red blood cells (RBC), by far the most commonly transfused product, poor transfusion efficacy can result from units damaged by the so-called storage lesion – a range of biochemical and biomechanical changes that occur during storage. With red cells, this can decrease viability and ability for tissue oxygenation. Although some of the biochemical changes are reversible after the blood is transfused, the biomechanical changes are less so, and rejuvenation products are not yet able to adequately reverse this phenomenon. There has been controversy about whether a given product unit's age is a factor in transfusion efficacy, specifically about whether "older" blood directly or indirectly increases risks of complications. Studies have not been consistent on answering this question, with some showing that older blood is indeed less effective but with others showing no such difference; these developments are being closely followed by hospital blood bankers – who are the physicians, typically pathologists, who collect and manage inventories of transfusable blood units.

Certain regulatory measures are in place to minimize RBC storage lesion – including a maximum shelf life (currently 42 days), a maximum auto-hemolysis threshold (currently 1% in the US, 0.8% in Europe), and a minimum level of post-transfusion RBC survival in vivo (currently 75% after 24 hours). However, all of these criteria are applied in a universal manner that does not account for differences among units of product. For example, testing for the post-transfusion RBC survival in vivo is done on a sample of healthy volunteers, and then compliance is presumed for all RBC units based on universal (GMP) processing standards (RBC survival by itself does not guarantee efficacy, but it is a necessary prerequisite for cell function, and hence serves as a regulatory proxy). Opinions vary as to the "best" way to determine transfusion efficacy in a patient in vivo. In general, there are not yet any in vitro tests to assess quality or predict efficacy for specific units of RBC blood product prior to their transfusion, though there is exploration of potentially relevant tests based on RBC membrane properties such as erythrocyte deformability and erythrocyte fragility (mechanical).

Physicians have adopted a so-called "restrictive protocol" – whereby transfusion is held to a minimum – in part because of the noted uncertainties surrounding storage lesion, in addition to the very high direct and indirect costs of transfusions. However, the restrictive protocol is not an option with some especially vulnerable patients who may require the best possible efforts to rapidly restore tissue oxygenation.

Although transfusions of platelets are far less numerous (relative to RBC), platelet storage lesion and resulting efficacy loss is also a concern.

=== Other ===
- A relationship between intra-operative blood transfusion and cancer recurrence has been observed in colorectal cancer. In lung cancer intra-operative blood transfusion has been associated with earlier recurrence of cancer, worse survival rates and poorer outcomes after lung resection. Suppression of the immune system by blood transfusion has been implicated as playing a role in more than 10 different cancer types, through mechanisms involving the innate and adaptive immune system. Five major mechanisms for this include the lymphocyte-T set, myeloid-derived suppressor cells (MDSCs), tumor-associated macrophages (TAMs), natural killer cells (NKCs), and dendritic cells (DCs). Blood transfusion may modulate the activity of antitumor CD8+ cytotoxic T lymphocytes (CD8+/CTL), temporal response of Tregs, and the STAT3 signaling pathway. The role of the antitumor immune response in cancer therapeutics was explored historically through the use of bacteria to enhance the antitumor immune response and more recently in cellular Immunotherapy. However, the impact of transfusion-related immunomodulation (TRIM) on cancer progression has not been definitively established and requires further study.
- In retrospective studies, blood transfusion has been associated with worse outcomes after cytoreductive surgery and HIPEC. However, correlation does not prove causation, and transfused patients often have more complicated surgeries and more underlying cardiopulmonary disease compared to untransfused patients; conclusions should be based on prospective randomized controlled trials.
- Hypothermia can occur with transfusions with large quantities of blood products which normally are stored at cold temperatures. Core body temperature can go down as low as 32 °C and can produce physiologic disturbances. Prevention should be done with warming the blood to ambient temperature prior to transfusions. Blood warming devices are available to avoid the hemolysis that would occur from unsafe practices such as microwaving.
- Transfusions with large amounts of red blood cells, whether due to severe hemorrhaging and/or transfusion inefficacy (see above), can lead to an inclination for bleeding. The mechanism is thought to be due to disseminated intravascular coagulation, along with dilution of recipient platelets and coagulation factors. Close monitoring and transfusions with platelets and plasma is indicated when necessary. Progressive hemorrhagic injury (PHI) in traumatic brain injured patients may be worsened by liberal transfusion strategies.
- Metabolic alkalosis can occur with massive blood transfusions because of the breakdown of citrate stored in blood into bicarbonate. However, acidemia is common in massively transfused patients, and acid-base balance is affected by complex factors.
- Hypocalcemia can also occur with massive blood transfusions because of the complex of citrate with serum calcium. Calcium levels below 0.9 mmol/L should be treated.
- Blood doping has been used by athletes to increase physical stamina. A lack of knowledge and insufficient experience can turn a blood transfusion into a dangerous event. For example, improper storage involving freezing and thawing, or minor antigen incompatibility, could lead to hemolysis.

== Frequency of use ==
Globally around 85 million units of red blood cells are transfused in a given year. The global demand is much higher and there is an unmet need for safe blood for transfusion in many low- and middle-income countries.

In the United States, blood transfusions were performed nearly 3 million times during hospitalizations in 2011, making it the most common procedure performed. The rate of hospitalizations with a blood transfusion nearly doubled from 1997, from a rate of 40 stays to 95 stays per 10,000 population. It was the most common procedure performed for patients 45 years of age and older in 2011, and among the top five most common for patients between the ages of 1 and 44 years.

According to the New York Times: "Changes in medicine have eliminated the need for millions of blood transfusions, which is good news for patients getting procedures like coronary bypasses and other procedures that once required a lot of blood." And, "Blood bank revenue is falling, and the decline may reach $1.5 billion a year this year [2014] from a high of $5 billion in 2008." In 2014, the Red Cross was predicting job losses as high as 12,000 within the next three to five years, roughly a quarter of the total in the industry. As of 2019, the trend of declining transfusions appeared to be stabilizing, with 10,852,000 RBC units transfused in the United States.

== History ==
Beginning with William Harvey's experiments on the circulation of blood, recorded research into blood transfusion began in the 17th century, with successful experiments in transfusion between animals. However, successive attempts by physicians to transfuse animal blood into humans gave variable, often fatal, results.

=== Early attempts ===
==== Animal blood ====
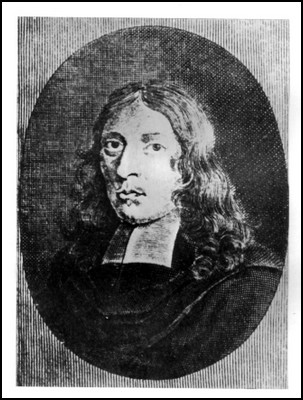
Richard Lower pioneered the first blood transfusion from animal to human in 1665 at the Royal Society.

Working at the Royal Society in the 1660s, the physician Richard Lower began examining the effects of changes in blood volume on circulatory function and developed methods for cross-circulatory study in animals, obviating clotting by closed arteriovenous connections. The new instruments he was able to devise enabled him to perform the first reliably documented successful transfusion of blood in front of his distinguished colleagues from the Royal Society.

According to Lower's account, "...towards the end of February 1665 [I] selected one dog of medium size, opened its jugular vein, and drew off blood, until its strength was nearly gone. Then, to make up for the great loss of this dog by the blood of a second, I introduced blood from the cervical artery of a fairly large mastiff, which had been fastened alongside the first, until this latter animal showed ... it was overfilled ... by the inflowing blood." After he "sewed up the jugular veins", the animal recovered "with no sign of discomfort or of displeasure".

Lower had performed the first blood transfusion between animals. He was then "requested by the Honorable [Robert] Boyle ... to acquaint the Royal Society with the procedure for the whole experiment", which he did in December 1665 in the Society's Philosophical Transactions.

The first blood transfusion from animal to human was administered by Jean-Baptiste Denys, eminent physician to King Louis XIV of France, on June 15, 1667. He transfused the blood of a sheep into a 15-year-old boy, who survived the transfusion. Denys performed another transfusion into a labourer, who also survived. Both instances were likely due to the small amount of blood that was actually transfused into these people. This allowed them to withstand the allergic reaction.

Denys's third patient to undergo a blood transfusion was Swedish Baron Gustaf Bonde. He received two transfusions. After the second transfusion Bonde died. In the winter of 1667, Denys performed several transfusions on Antoine Mauroy with calf's blood. On the third account Mauroy died.

Six months later in London, Lower performed the first human transfusion of animal blood in Britain, where he "superintended the introduction in [a patient's] arm at various times of some ounces of sheep's blood at a meeting of the Royal Society, and without any inconvenience to him." The recipient was Arthur Coga, "the subject of a harmless form of insanity." Sheep's blood was used because of speculation about the value of blood exchange between species; it had been suggested that blood from a gentle lamb might quiet the tempestuous spirit of an agitated person and that the shy might be made outgoing by blood from more sociable creatures. Coga received 20 shillings (equivalent to £206 in 2025) to participate in the experiment.

Lower went on to pioneer new devices for the precise control of blood flow and the transfusion of blood; his designs were substantially the same as modern syringes and catheters. Shortly after, Lower moved to London, where his growing practice soon led him to abandon research.

These early experiments with animal blood provoked a heated controversy in Britain and France. Finally, in 1668, the Royal Society and the French government both banned the procedure. The Vatican condemned these experiments in 1670. Blood transfusions fell into obscurity for the next 150 years.

==== Human blood ====
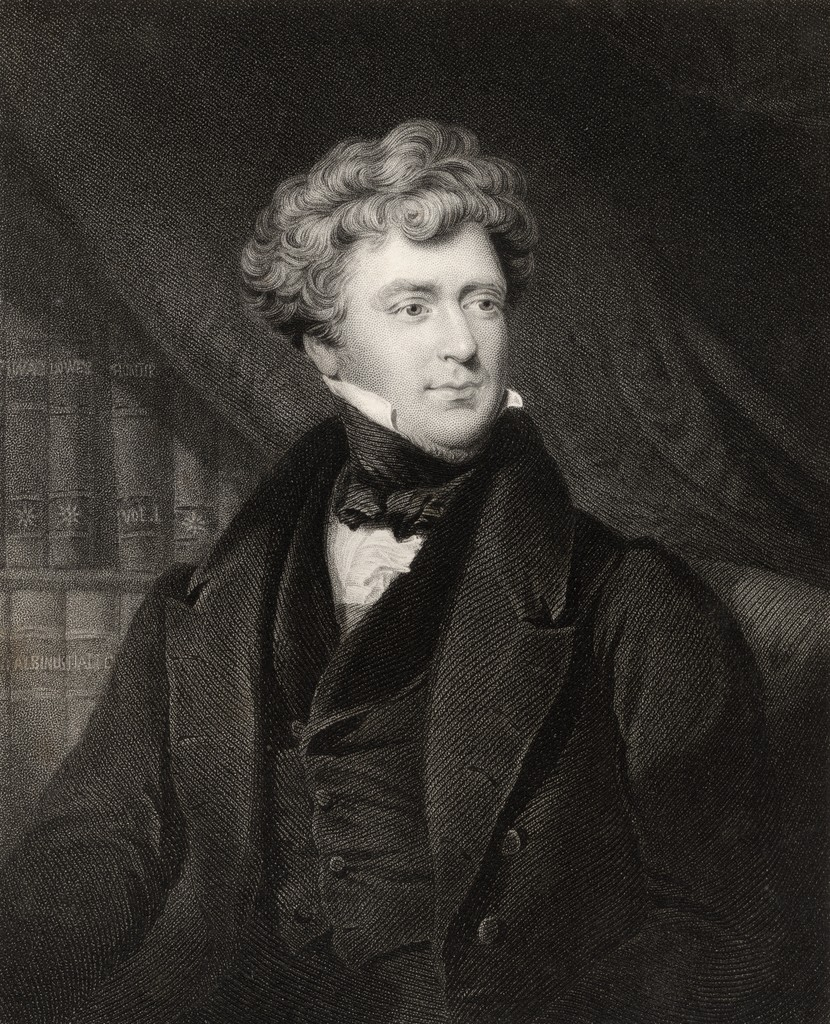
James Blundell successfully transfused human blood in 1818.

The science of blood transfusion dates to the first decade of the 20th century, with the discovery of distinct blood types leading to the practice of mixing some blood from the donor and the receiver before the transfusion (an early form of cross-matching).

In the early 19th century, British obstetrician James Blundell made efforts to treat hemorrhage by transfusion of human blood using a syringe. In 1818, after experiments with animals, he performed the first successful transfusion of human blood to treat postpartum hemorrhage at Guy's Hospital in London. Blundell used the patient's husband as a donor, and extracted four ounces of blood from his arm to transfuse into his wife. During the years 1825 and 1830, Blundell performed 10 transfusions, five of which were beneficial, and published his results. He also invented a number of instruments for the transfusion of blood. He made a substantial amount of money from this endeavour, roughly $2 million ($50 million real dollars).

In 1840, Samuel Armstrong Lane, aided by Blundell, performed the first successful whole blood transfusion to treat haemophilia at St George's Hospital Medical School in London.

However, early transfusions were risky and many resulted in the death of the patient. By the late 19th century, blood transfusion was regarded as a risky and dubious procedure, and was largely shunned by the medical establishment.

Work to emulate James Blundell continued in Edinburgh. In 1845 the Edinburgh Journal described the successful transfusion of blood to a woman with severe uterine bleeding. Subsequent transfusions were successful with patients of James Young Simpson, after whom the Simpson Memorial Maternity Pavilion in Edinburgh was named.

Various isolated reports of successful transfusions emerged towards the end of the 19th century. The largest series of early successful transfusions took place at the Edinburgh Royal Infirmary between 1885 and 1892. Edinburgh later became the home of the first blood donation and blood transfusion services.

=== 20th century ===
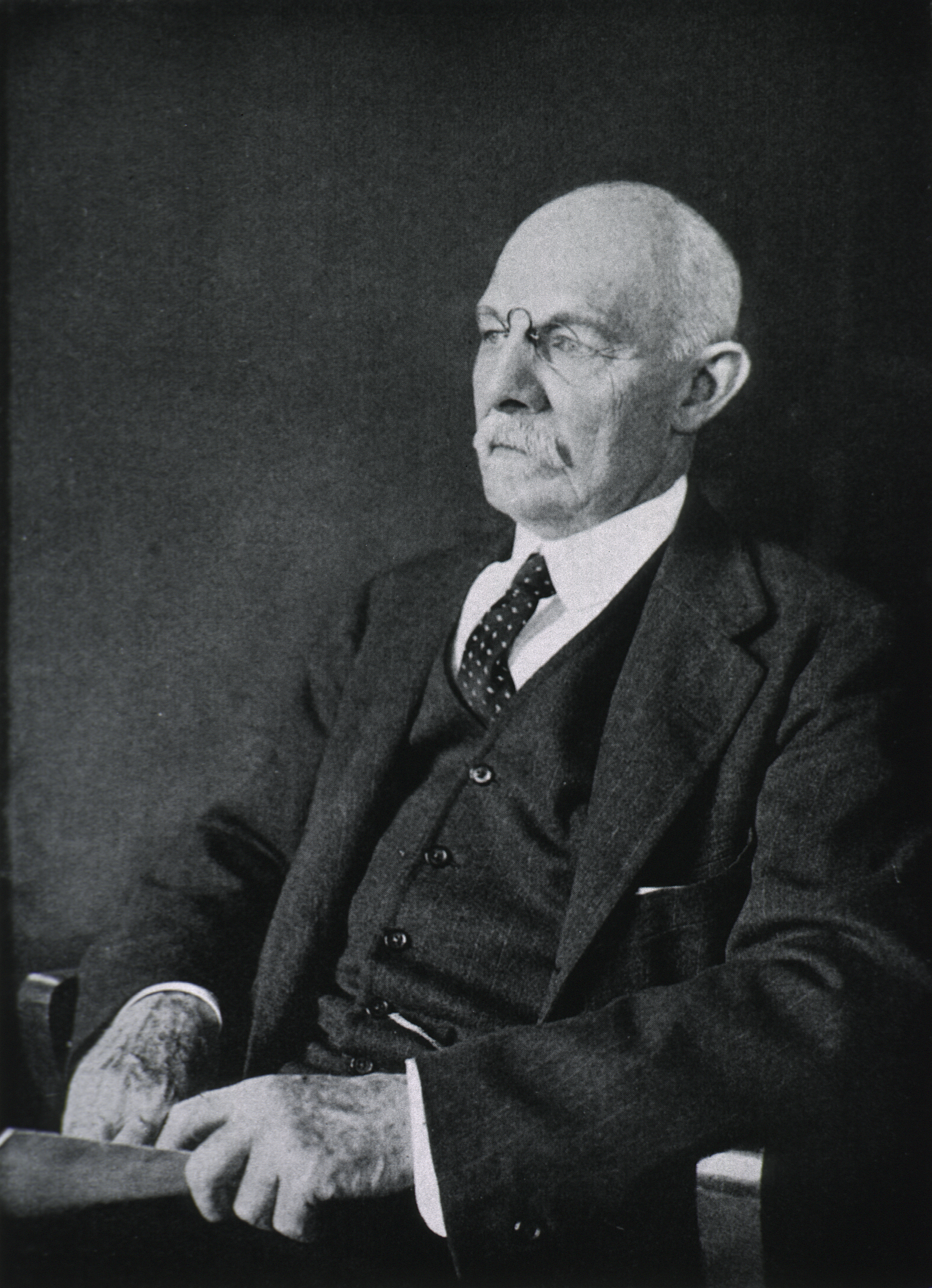
William Stewart Halsted, M.D. (1852–1922) performed one of the first blood transfusions in the United States.

Only in 1901, when the Austrian Karl Landsteiner discovered three human blood groups (O, A, and B), did blood transfusion achieve a scientific basis and become safer.

Landsteiner discovered that adverse effects arise from mixing blood from two incompatible individuals. He found that mixing incompatible types triggers an immune response and the red blood cells clump. The immunological reaction occurs when the receiver of a blood transfusion has antibodies against the donor blood cells. The destruction of red blood cells releases free hemoglobin into the bloodstream, which can have fatal consequences. Landsteiner's work made it possible to determine blood group and allowed blood transfusions to take place much more safely. For his discovery he won the Nobel Prize in Physiology and Medicine in 1930; many other blood groups have been discovered since.

George Washington Crile is credited with performing the first surgery using a direct blood transfusion in 1906 at St. Alexis Hospital in Cleveland while a professor of surgery at Case Western Reserve University.

Jan Janský also discovered the human blood groups; in 1907 he classified blood into four groups: I, II, III, IV. His nomenclature is still used in Russia and in states of the former USSR, in which blood types O, A, B, and AB are respectively designated I, II, III, and IV.

American physician William Lorenzo Moss's (1876–1957) developed a blood typing technique in 1910 (popularly known as Moss system of blood typing) that was widely used until World War II. The Moss technique also used Roman numerals using I, II, III, IV to correspond to AB, A, B, and O respectively; a potentially dangerous overlap with Janský's classification.

William Stewart Halsted (1852–1922), an American surgeon, performed one of the first blood transfusions in the United States. He had been called to see his sister after she had given birth. He found her moribund from blood loss, and in a bold move withdrew his own blood, transfused his blood into his sister, and then operated on her to save her life.

==== Blood banks in WWI ====
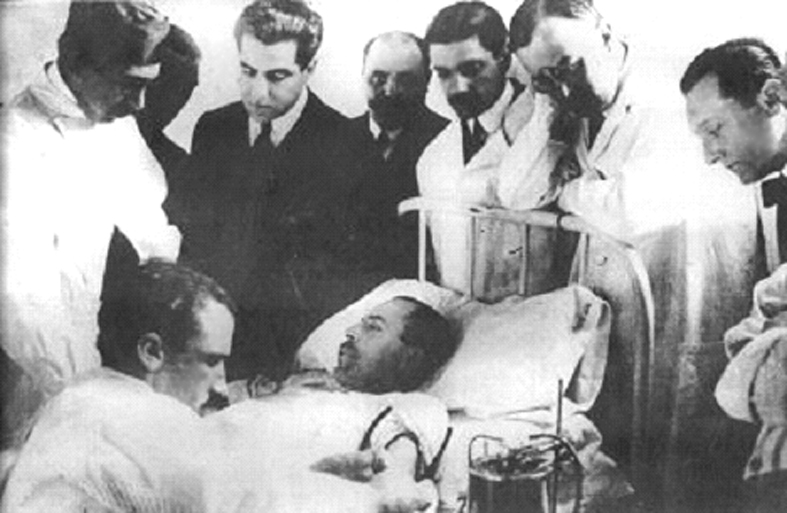
Luis Agote (2nd from right) overseeing one of the first safe and effective blood transfusions in 1914

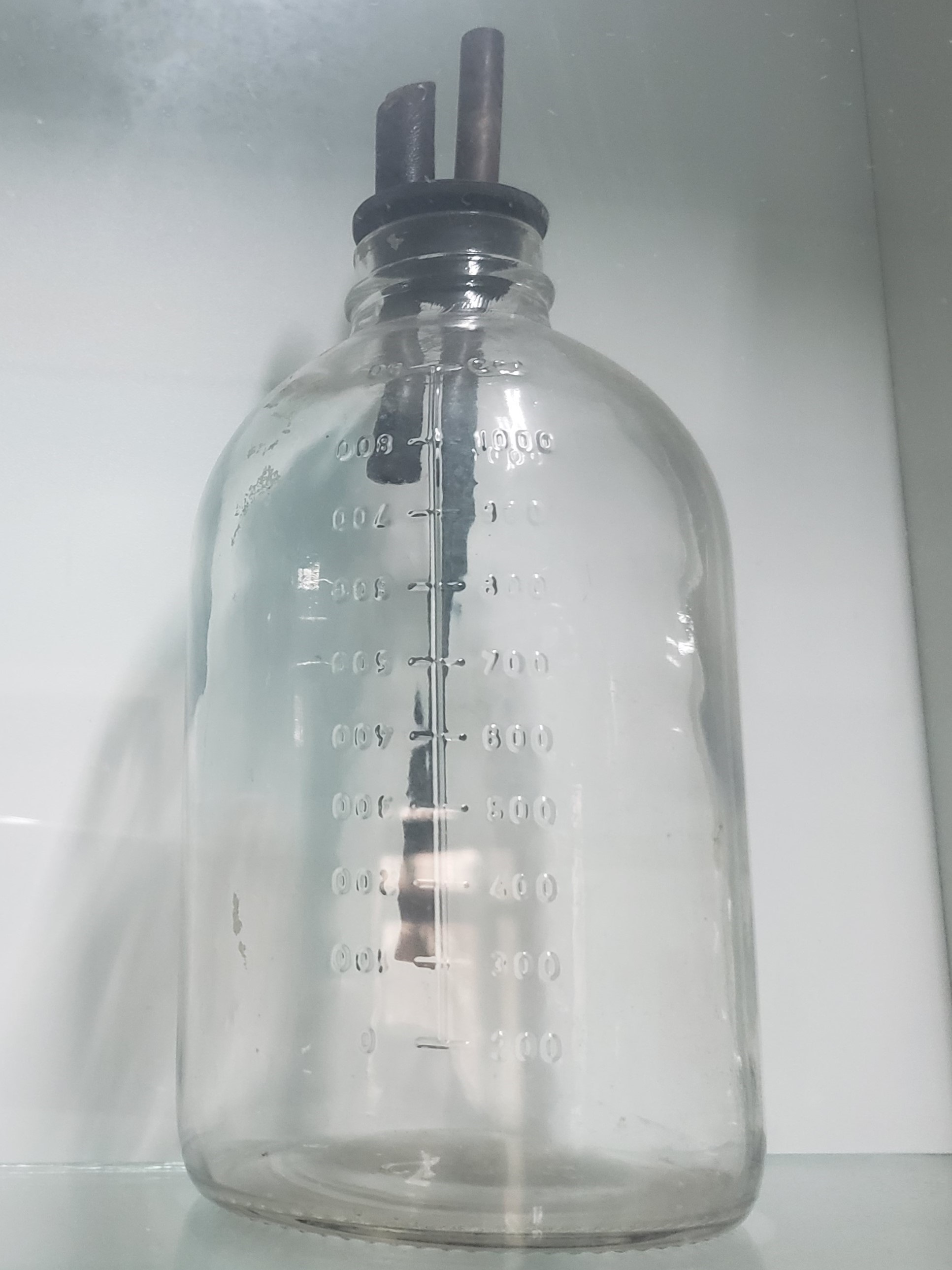
Old glass used for blood transfusion

While the first transfusions had to be made directly from donor to receiver before coagulation, it was discovered that by adding anticoagulant and refrigerating the blood it was possible to store it for some days, thus opening the way for the development of blood banks. John Braxton Hicks was the first to experiment with chemical methods to prevent the coagulation of blood at St Mary's Hospital, London in the late-19th century. His attempts, using phosphate of soda, however, proved unsuccessful.

The Belgian doctor Albert Hustin performed the first non-direct transfusion on March 27, 1914, though this involved a diluted solution of blood. The Argentine doctor Luis Agote used a much less diluted solution in November of the same year. Both used sodium citrate as an anticoagulant.

The First World War (1914–1918) acted as a catalyst for the rapid development of blood banks and transfusion techniques. Francis Peyton Rous and Joseph R. Turner at the Rockefeller University (then The Rockefeller Institute for Medical Research) made the first important discoveries that blood typing was necessary to avoid blood clumping (coagulation) and blood samples could be preserved using chemical treatment. Their first report in March 1915 showed that gelatine, agar, blood serum extracts, starch and beef albumin proved to be useless preservatives.

However, building on the same experiment, they discovered that a mixture sodium citrate and glucose (dextrose) solution was a perfect preservative; as they reported in February issue of the Journal of Experimental Medicine, the preserved bloods were just like fresh bloods and that they "function excellently when reintroduced into the body." Blood could be preserved for up to four weeks. An accompanying experiment using citrate-saccharose (sucrose) mixture was also a success which could maintain blood cells for two weeks. This use of citrate and sugars, sometimes known as Rous-Turner solution, was the foundation for the development of blood banks and improvement of transfusion method.

Another discovery of Rous and Turner was the most critical step in the safety of blood transfusion. Rous was well aware that Landsteiner's concept of blood types had not yet found practical value, as he remarked: "The fate of Landsteiner's effort to call attention to the practical bearing of the group differences in human bloods provides an exquisite instance of knowledge marking time on technique. Transfusion was still not done because (until at least 1915), the risk of clotting was too great." In June 1915, they made a crucial report in the Journal of the American Medical Association that agglutination could be avoided if the blood samples of the donor and recipient were tested before. Which they called a rapid and simple method for testing blood compatibility, sodium citrate was used to dilute the blood samples, and after mixing the recipient's and donor's blood in 9:1 and 1:1 parts, blood would either clump or remain watery after 15 minutes. According to their advice, blood without clumping "should always be chosen if possible."

Canadian doctor and Lieutenant Lawrence Bruce Robertson became instrumental in persuading the Royal Army Medical Corps to adopt the use of blood transfusion at the Casualty Clearing Stations for the wounded. In October 1915, Robertson performed his first wartime transfusion with a syringe to a patient who had multiple shrapnel wounds. He followed this up with four subsequent transfusions in the following months, and his success was reported to Sir Walter Morley Fletcher, director of the Medical Research Committee.

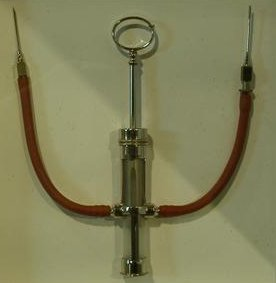
World War II Russian syringe for direct inter-human blood transfusion

Robertson published his findings in the British Medical Journal in 1916 and, with the help of a few like-minded individuals (including the eminent physician Edward William Archibald), was able to persuade the British authorities of the merits of blood transfusion. Robertson went on to establish the first blood-transfusion apparatus at a Casualty Clearing Station on the Western Front in the spring of 1917. Robertson did not test crossmatching so that one died of hemolysis in his 1916 transfusion, and three in 1917.

Oswald Hope Robertson, a medical researcher and U.S. Army officer, was attached to the RAMC in 1917, where he became instrumental in establishing the first blood banks in preparation for the anticipated Third Battle of Ypres. He used sodium citrate as the anticoagulant; blood was extracted from punctures in the vein and was stored in bottles at British and American Casualty Clearing Stations along the Front. Robertson also experimented with preserving separated red blood cells in iced bottles. Geoffrey Keynes, a British surgeon, developed a portable machine that could store blood to enable transfusions to be carried out more easily.

==== Expansion ====
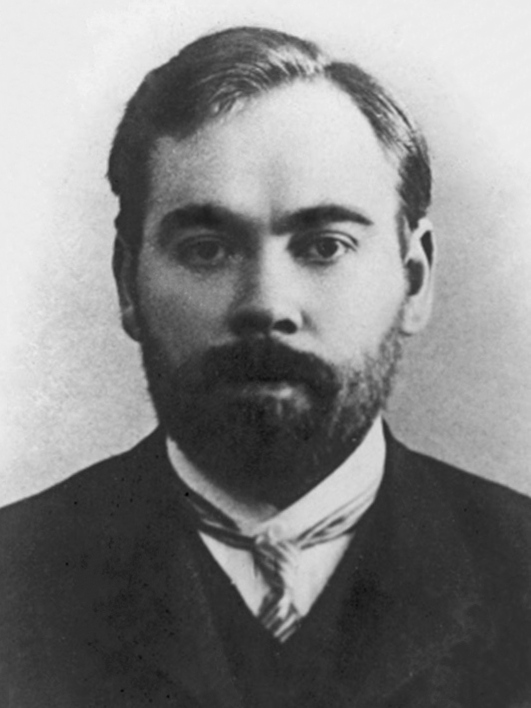
Alexander Bogdanov established a scientific institute to research the effects of blood transfusion in Moscow, 1925.

The secretary of the British Red Cross, Percy Lane Oliver, established the world's first blood-donor service in 1921. In that year, Oliver was contacted by King's College Hospital, where they were in urgent need of a blood donor. After providing a donor, Oliver set about organizing a system for the voluntary registration of blood donors at clinics around London, with Sir Geoffrey Keynes appointed as a medical adviser. Volunteers were subjected to a series of physical tests to establish their blood group. The London Blood Transfusion Service was free of charge and expanded rapidly in its first few years of operation. By 1925 it was providing services for almost 500 patients; it was incorporated into the structure of the British Red Cross in 1926. Similar systems developed in other cities, including Sheffield, Manchester and Norwich, and the service's work began to attract international attention. France, Germany, Austria, Belgium, Australia and Japan established similar services.

Alexander Bogdanov founded an academic institution devoted to the science of blood transfusion in Moscow in 1925. Bogdanov was motivated, at least in part, by a search for eternal youth, and remarked with satisfaction on the improvement of his eyesight, suspension of balding, and other positive symptoms after receiving 11 transfusions of whole blood. Bogdanov died in 1928 as a result of one of his experiments, when the blood of a student with malaria and tuberculosis was given to him in a transfusion. Following Bogdanov's lead, Vladimir Shamov and Sergei Yudin in the USSR pioneered the transfusion of cadaveric blood from recently deceased donors. Yudin performed such a transfusion successfully for the first time on March 23, 1930, and reported his first seven clinical transfusions with cadaveric blood at the Fourth Congress of Ukrainian Surgeons at Kharkiv in September. However, this method was never used widely, even in the Soviet Union. Nevertheless, the Soviet Union was the first to establish a network of facilities to collect and store blood for use in transfusions at hospitals.

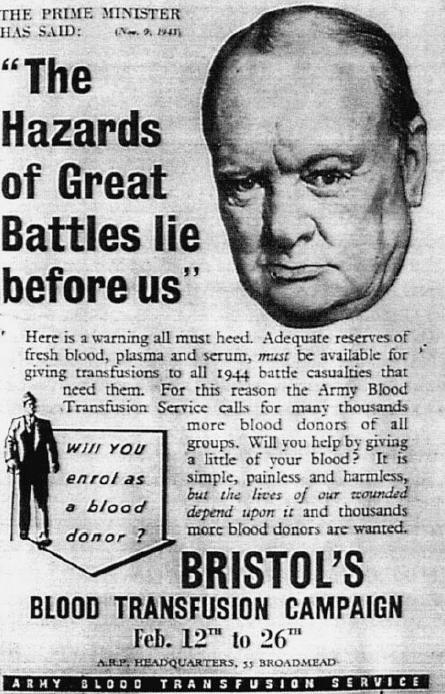
British poster of 1944 encouraging people to donate blood for the war effort

Frederic Durán-Jordà established one of the earliest blood banks during the Spanish Civil War in 1936. Duran joined the Transfusion Service at the Barcelona Hospital at the start of the conflict, but the hospital was soon overwhelmed by the demand for blood and the paucity of available donors. With support from the Department of Health of the Spanish Republican Army, Duran established a blood bank for the use of wounded soldiers and civilians. The 300–400 mL of extracted blood was mixed with 10% citrate solution in a modified Duran Erlenmeyer flask. The blood was stored in a sterile glass enclosed under pressure at 2 °C. During 30 months of work, the Transfusion Service of Barcelona registered almost 30,000 donors, and processed 9,000 liters of blood.

In 1937 Bernard Fantus, director of therapeutics at the Cook County Hospital in Chicago, established the first hospital blood-bank in the United States. In setting up a hospital laboratory that preserved, refrigerated and stored donor blood, Fantus originated the term "blood bank". Within a few years, hospital and community blood-banks were established across the United States. Until the middle of World War II, the newly established US blood banks rejected African-American donors. During the war, Black people were allowed to donate blood, but the donated blood was labeled as being suitable only for transfusion into another person from the same race.

Frederic Durán-Jordà fled to Britain in 1938 and worked with Dr Janet Vaughan at the Royal Postgraduate Medical School at Hammersmith Hospital to establish a system of national blood banks in London. With the outbreak of war appearing imminent in 1938, the War Office created the Army Blood Supply Depot (ABSD) in Bristol, headed by Lionel Whitby and in control of four large blood-depots around the country. British policy through the war was to supply military personnel with blood from centralized depots, in contrast to the approach taken by the Americans and Germans where troops at the front were bled to provide required blood. The British method proved more successful in adequately meeting all requirements, and over 700,000 donors were bled over the course of the war. This system evolved into the National Blood Transfusion Service established in 1946, the first national service to be implemented.

Stories tell of Nazis in Eastern Europe during World War II using captive children as repeated involuntary blood-donors.

==== Medical advances ====
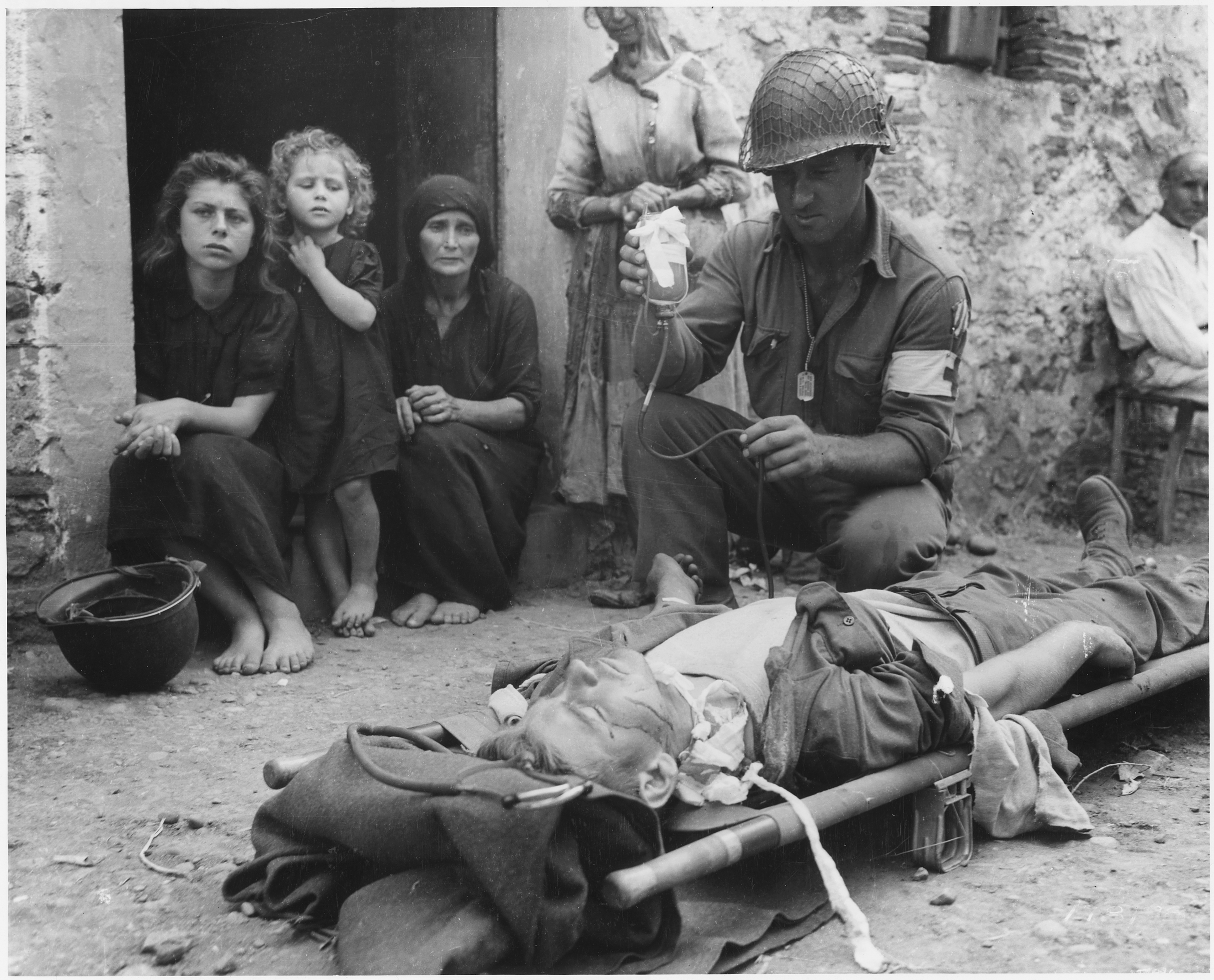
Wounded soldier being given blood plasma in Sicily, 1943

Gordon R. Ward, writing in the correspondence columns of the British Medical Journal, proposed the use of blood plasma as a substitute for whole blood and for transfusion purposes as early as 1918. At the onset of World War II, liquid plasma was used in Britain. A large project, known as "Blood for Britain", began in August 1940 to collect blood in New York City hospitals for the export of plasma to Britain. Following heavy casualties in the Battle of Dunkirk, the Blood Transfusion Association in New York City originated the campaign that was enlarged to the whole US by the Red Cross, and was called the National Blood Programme. At the time, American physician Edwin Cohn pioneered the process of blood fractionation. He worked out the techniques for isolating the serum albumin fraction of blood plasma, which is essential for maintaining the osmotic pressure in the blood vessels, preventing their collapse. A freeze-dried plasma package was developed by the Surgeons General of the Army and Navy, working with the National Research Council, which reduced breakage and made transportation, packaging, and storage much simpler.

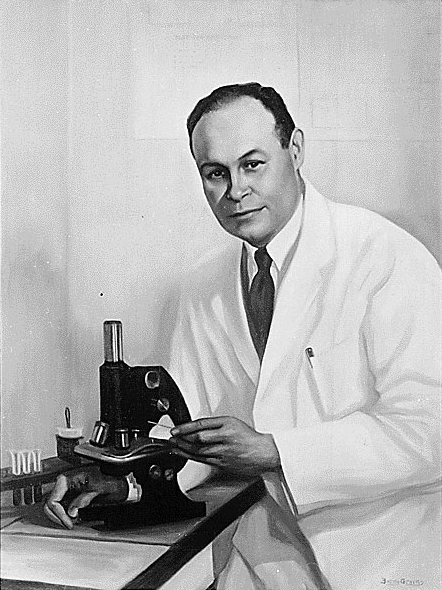
Charles R. Drew oversaw the production of blood plasma for shipping to Britain during WW2.

The resulting dried plasma package came in two tin cans containing 400 mL bottles. One bottle contained enough distilled water to reconstitute the dried plasma contained within the other bottle. In about three minutes, the plasma would be ready to use and could stay fresh for around four hours. Charles R. Drew was appointed medical supervisor, and he was able to transform the test-tube methods into the first successful technique for mass production.

Another important breakthrough came in 1937–40 when Karl Landsteiner (1868–1943), Alex Wiener, Philip Levine, and R.E. Stetson discovered the Rhesus blood group system, which was found to be the cause of the majority of transfusion reactions up to that time. Three years later, the introduction by J.F. Loutit and Patrick L. Mollison of acid–citrate–dextrose (ACD) solution, which reduced the volume of anticoagulant, permitted transfusions of greater volumes of blood and allowed longer-term storage.

Carl Walter and W.P. Murphy Jr. introduced the plastic bag for blood collection in 1950. Replacing breakable glass bottles with durable plastic bags made from PVC allowed for the evolution of a collection system capable of safe and easy preparation of multiple blood components from a single unit of whole blood.

In the field of cancer surgery, the replacement of massive blood-loss became a major problem. The cardiac-arrest rate was high. In 1963 C. Paul Boyan and William S. Howland discovered that the temperature of the blood and the rate of infusion greatly affected survival rates, and introduced blood warming to surgery.

Further extending the shelf-life of stored blood up to 42 days was an anticoagulant preservative, CPDA-1, introduced in 1979, which increased the blood supply and facilitated resource-sharing among blood banks.

As of 2006 about 15 million units of blood products were transfused per year in the United States. By 2013 the number had declined to about 11 million units, because of the shift towards laparoscopic surgery and other surgical advances and studies that have shown that many transfusions were unnecessary. For example, the standard of care reduced the amount of blood transfused in one case from 750 to 200 mL. In 2019, 10,852,000 RBC units, 2,243,000 platelet units, and 2,285,000 plasma units were transfused in the United States.

== Special populations ==
=== Neonate ===
To ensure the safety of blood transfusion to pediatric patients, hospitals are taking additional precautions to avoid infection and prefer to use pediatric blood units that are guaranteed "safe" from Cytomegalovirus. Some guidelines have recommended the provision of CMV-negative blood components and not simply leukoreduced components for newborns or low birthweight infants in whom the immune system is not fully developed, but practice varies. These requirements place additional restrictions on blood donors who can donate for neonatal use, which may be impractical given the rarity of CMV seronegative donors and the preference for fresh units.

Neonatal transfusions typically fall into one of two categories:

- "Top-up" transfusions, to replace losses due to investigational losses and correction of anemia.
- Exchange (or partial exchange) transfusions are done for removal of bilirubin, removal of antibodies and replacement of red cells (e.g., for anemia secondary to thalassemias and other hemoglobinopathies or fetal erythroblastosis).

=== Significant blood loss ===
A massive transfusion protocol is used when significant blood loss is present such as in major trauma, when more than ten units of blood are needed. Packed red blood cells, fresh frozen plasma, and platelets are generally administered. Typical ratios of fresh frozen plasma, platelets and packed red blood cells are between 1:1:1 and 1:1:2.

In some locations, blood has begun to be administered pre-hospital in an effort to reduce preventable deaths from significant blood loss. Earlier analyses suggested that in the US, up to 31,000 patients per year bleed to death that otherwise could have survived if pre-hospital transfusions were widely available. For example, when a mother experiences severe blood loss during pregnancy, ambulances are able to arrive with blood stored in portable, FDA listed blood refrigerators, similar to those found in blood banks. Once the infusion is given on scene, the patient and the ambulance have more time to get to a hospital for surgery and additional infusions if needed. This could be critical in rural areas or sprawling cities where patients can be far from a major hospital and the local emergency medical team may need to use blood infusions to keep that patient alive during transport. Larger studies pointed to improvements in 24-hour mortality with pre-hospital plasma and RBC transfusions, but no difference in 30-day or long-term mortality.

=== Unknown blood type ===
Because blood type O negative is compatible with anyone, it is often overused and in short supply. According to the Association for the Advancement of Blood and Biotherapies, the use of this blood should be restricted to persons with O negative blood, as nothing else is compatible with them, and women who might be pregnant and for whom it would be impossible to do blood group testing before giving them emergency treatment. Whenever possible, the AABB recommends that O negative blood be conserved by using blood type testing to identify a less scarce alternative.

=== Bombay blood ===
Also known as hh blood group, this rare blood type cannot receive blood from any of the ABO blood group, and must receive hh blood from either another person with this condition or themselves (autologous transfusions).

=== Blood deserts ===
Since blood products acquisition, storage, transportation, and administration requires extensive infrastructure, there are several regions in which there is no blood, colloquially referred to as blood deserts. In these regions, blood transfusion is often not possible, and communities may have to rely on the commonly illegal practice of drawing blood directly from other community members. Blood deserts are a serious global health crisis that affects many people every year.

=== Religious objections ===
Jehovah's Witnesses object to the transfusion of whole blood, and formerly also rejected the transfusion of its four main components of blood: red blood cells, white blood cells, platelets and plasma. This is based on an interpretation of their broader belief that blood is sacred. In September 2026, the Governing Body of Jehovah's Witness updated their policy to allow individual members to decide whether to donate or accept separate blood components without facing the risk of excommunication or disciplinary action from their local congregation. However, as of 2026, the ban on transfusing whole blood has not changed.

=== Personal objections ===
Sometimes people refuse blood transfusions because of fears about the safety of the blood supply. Generally speaking, the rules of informed consent allow mentally competent adults to refuse blood transfusions even when their objections are based on misinformation or prejudice and even when their refusal may result in serious and permanent harm, including death. For example, since COVID-19 vaccines became available, some people have refused blood transfusions because the donor might have been vaccinated, and they fear that this would cause secondhand harm to them. This choice is based on false beliefs, but a mentally competent adult's choices are normally respected. However, if doctor's opinions are that parents and guardians are making harmful choices about children, they can be overruled (in some jurisdictions) using legal arguments based on the harm principle; in this case if doctors believe that refusing the blood transfusion would put the child at risk of serious injury or death. Blood banks do not collect information that is irrelevant to the transfusion process, including the donors' race, ethnicity, sexual orientation, COVID-19 vaccination status, etc., so selecting blood units based on the individual's personal objections is not practical.

== Research into alternatives ==
Although there are clinical situations where transfusion with red blood cells is the only clinically appropriate option, clinicians look at whether alternatives are feasible. This can be due to several reasons, such as patient safety, economic burden or scarcity of blood. Guidelines recommend blood transfusions should be reserved for patients with or at risk of cardiovascular instability due to the degree of their anaemia. In stable patients with iron deficiency anemia, oral or parenteral iron is recommended.

Non-blood volume expanders are available for cases where only volume restoration is required, but a substance with oxygen-carrying capacity would help doctors and surgeons avoid the risks of disease transmission and immune suppression, address the chronic blood donor shortage, and address the concerns of Jehovah's Witnesses and others who have religious objections to receiving transfused blood.

The research in this area is ongoing. A number of blood substitutes have been explored, but thus far they all have serious limitations, and as of 2023 no blood substitutes have been approved for use in transfusions, however the European Union, Russia, South Africa and Mexico have all approved the use of blood substitutes in other clinical settings. Most attempts to find a suitable alternative to blood thus far have concentrated on cell-free hemoglobin solutions. Blood substitutes could make transfusions more readily available in emergency medicine and in pre-hospital EMS care. If successful, such a blood substitute could save many lives, particularly in trauma where massive blood loss results. Recent research has also explored blood-filtration and pathogen-removal technologies that could allow contaminated blood collected during trauma or surgery to be cleaned and safely returned to the patient through autologous transfusion, potentially reducing reliance on donor blood in emergency settings. For example, intraoperative cell salvage systems are already used in some surgical settings to collect, filter, and reinfuse a patient's own blood during procedures with significant blood loss. Hemopure, a hemoglobin-based therapy, is approved for use in South Africa and has been used in the United States on a case-by-case basis through the emergency Investigational New Drug (IND) process. In the mean time, bloodless medicine emerged as a new discipline in blood transfusion treatment paradigm to fill these gaps. Bloodless medicine employs various strategies to reduce the risk in the surgical treatment of "bloodless patients' using techniques like erythropoiesis-stimulating agents, autologous blood salvage, and minimizing blood loss during surgery.

== Veterinary use ==
Veterinarians also administer transfusions to other animals. Various species require different levels of testing to ensure a compatible match. For example, cats have 3 known blood types, cattle have 11, dogs have at least 13, pigs have 16, and horses over 30. However, in many species (especially horses and dogs), cross matching is not required before the first transfusion, as antibodies against non-self cell surface antigens are not expressed constitutively – i.e. the animal has to be sensitized before it will mount an immune response against the transfused blood.

The rare and experimental practice of inter-species blood transfusions (xenotransfusion) is a form of xenograft.

== See also ==
- Arnault Tzanck
- Blood transfusion in Sri Lanka
- Young blood transfusion, a pseudoscientific practice involving the transfusion of blood taken from young donors to older recipients that is claimed to have health benefits
- Transdifferentiation
- AIDS
