= Bernard Fantus =

American physician (1874–1940)

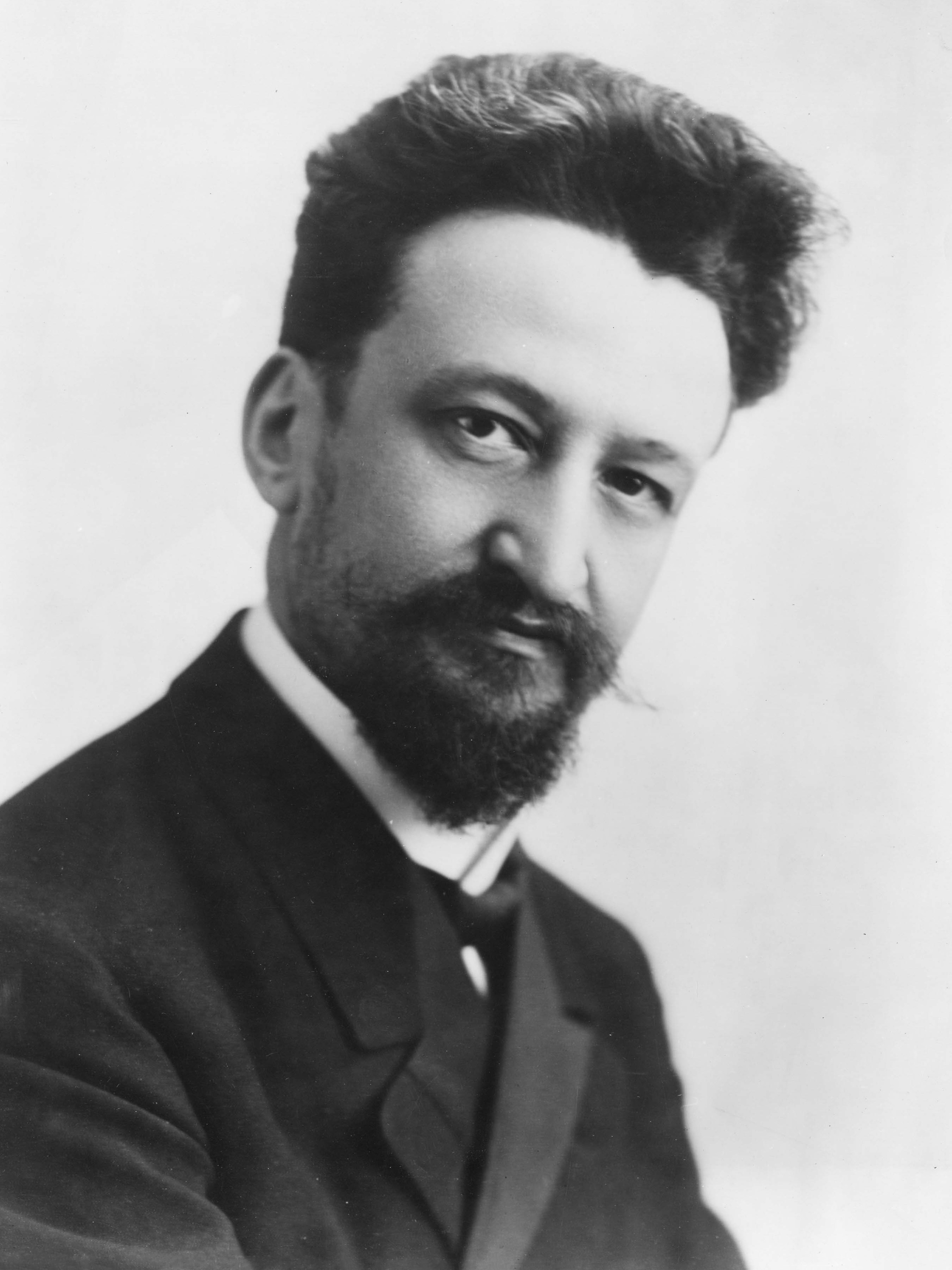
- Born: September 1, 1874; Budapest, Hungary
- Died: April 14, 1940
- Education: University of Illinois; University of Michigan

Bernard Fantus (September 1, 1874 – April 14, 1940) was a Hungarian Jewish-American physician. He established the first hospital blood bank in the United States in 1937 at Cook County Hospital, Chicago while he served there as director of the pharmacology and therapeutics department.

== Biography ==
Bernard Fantus was born to David and Ida (Gentilli) Fantus in Budapest, Hungary. As a child, Fantus was educated at Real-Gymnasium in Vienna, Austria. From a young age, his parents supported his ambition to be a physician. In 1889, at the age of fifteen, he and his parents immigrated to the United States. In Detroit, Michigan, Fantus was an apprentice for Mr. Leushner at Paul Leuchner's Drug store, who began training him in pharmacy. By 1902 the family relocated to Chicago, Illinois.

Fantus received his Doctor of Medicine in 1899 from the College of Physicians and Surgeons (Chicago).He furthered his education by doing post-graduate work at the University of Strasbourg in 1906 and the University of Berlin in 1909. Fantus also received a Master of Science from the University of Michigan in 1917, where he had done research in Pharmacology with Professor Cushny during the summer of 1901.

Fantus married Emily Senn, a nurse who he met at Cook County Hospital, on September 1, 1907. He had a daughter named Ruth.

- Daughter Ruth Fantus aka Valeri Gendron (December 14, 1913 – March 21, 1989): Adopted

After suffering a heart attack the year prior, Fantus died on April 14, 1940, at the age of sixty-five. Fantus was buried at Forest Home Cemetery (Chicago).

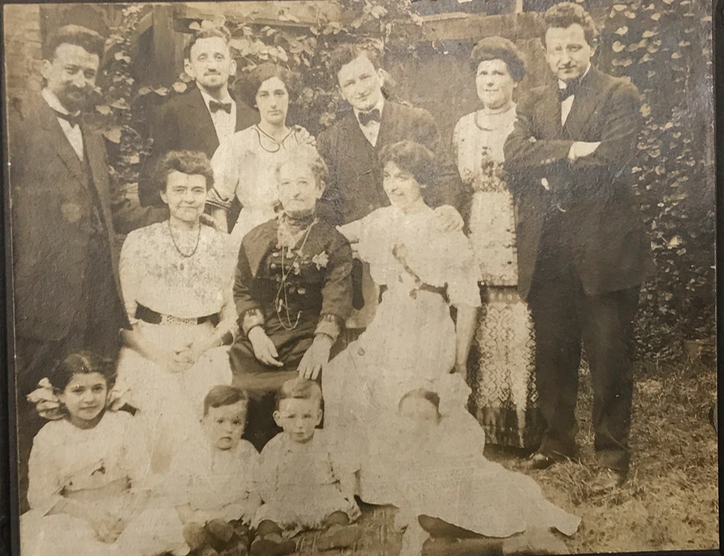
Family Photo (Fantus at top left)

=== Career ===
Year	Location	Position
1899-1900	Cook County Hospital	Intern
1900-1902	University of Illinois	Adjunct Professor of materia medica and therapeutics
1902-1912	University of Illinois	Professor of materia medica and therapeutics
1909-1912	University of Illinois	Assistant Professor of Clinical Medication
1913-1917	University of Illinois	Professor of Pharmacology and Therapeutics
1918-1924	Rush Medical College	Associate Professor of Therapeutics
1924	Rush Medical College	Clinical Professor of Medicine

=== Palatable Medication ===
From about 1910–1915, at the Pharmacological Laboratory of the University of Illinois, Fantus conducted research in order to formulate medications that were more enjoyable to children. Knowing that medication in the form of candy would be best for children, Fantus studied candy confection and worked with candy-makers in order to determine that "sweet tablets" would be the best way to administer medicine to kids in a candy form. Fantus' goal was to create medications that were not only palatable to children, but relatively easy and inexpensive to make, in order for them to be readily available and accessible to the public. Strong emphasis was put on the ability of the tablet to dissolve, to be an attractive color, and to have a palatable sweet flavor not reminiscent of typical medicine.

In order to make sweet tablets, one needs a tablet machine. Fantus recommends the No. 25 Machine from the Whitall Tatum Company, which, at the time, was effective and inexpensive at only ten dollars.

Fantus found that the most effect way to disguise the taste of medicine and still maintain an effective integrity that met his criteria was with sugar coating and the use of tolu. The idea was to cover the medicine with resin then sugar. To saturate the granules of medical powders, Fantus used a solution consisting of tolu, saccharin, and alcohol. Fantus suggests the addition of saccharin to lessen any aftertaste.

Unfortunately, however, many a child has had its palate offended by liquid medicines to such a degree that it abhors spoon-medicine of any kind, and will struggle even against the most palatable. When one witnesses the struggling of the average child against the average medicine, one cannot but wonder whether at times the struggle does not do more harm than the medicine can do good, and wish that we had other means of administering medicines to the little ones. As all children love candy, this would seem the form most desirable for them.

— Candy Medication, Bernard Fantus,

==== Candy Medication ====
In 1915, Fantus published a book called Candy Medication. Through his book, Fantus sought to make sweet tablets common place by giving pharmacists and physicians a guide book of sorts.

It is the author's hope that this booklet may be instrumental in robbing childhood of one of its terrors, namely, nasty medicine; that it may lessen the difficulties experienced by nurse and mother in giving medicament to the sick child; and help to make the doctor more popular with the little ones.

— Candy Medication, Bernard Fantus

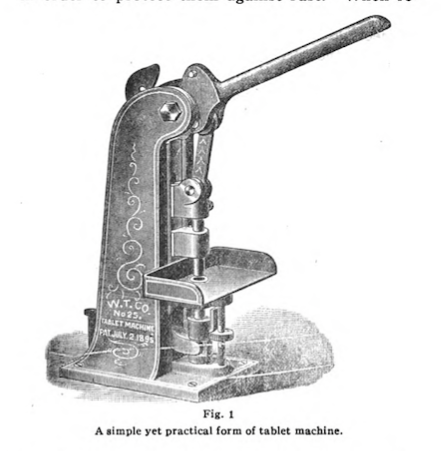

===== Contents =====
1. Historical Introduction
2. Tabellae Dulces
3. The Uses of Sweet Tablets
4. The Making of Sweet Tablets
5. The Tablet Machine
6. The Construction off Formulae for Sweet Tablets
  - Choice of Flavor
  - Subduing of Tastes
  - Choice of Color
7. Formulae for the Preparation of Sweet Tablets
8. Formulae for Stock Preparations

In the book, Fantus includes sweet tablet formulas for the following:

- Acetophenetidin
- Acetaminosalol
- Cocaine
- Heroin
- Aspirin
- Aconitine
- Anaesthesin
- Antimony potassium tartrate
- Antipyrine
- Apomorphine
- Arsenic trioxide
- Atropine
- Bismuth subcarbonate
- Bismuth subnitrate
- Caffeine
- Charcoal
- Cerium oxalate
- Chalk
- Emetine
- Lactic acid fermentation
- Ferrous carbonate
- Arsenic
- Iron
- Quinine
- Strychnine
- Nitroglycerin (drug)
- Urotropin
- Mercury chloride
- Mercury(II) iodide
- Hyoscine

In 1918, three years after the publication of Candy Medication, Fantus published an article in the Journal of the American Pharmaceutical Association entitled "Tolu and sugar coating in the disguising of medicines," in which he amended some of his formulas from the book.

=== Therapeutics ===
Therapeutics involves the comprehensive care of patients and is sometimes considered the science of healing. Preventative medicine and the proper use of drugs in treatments and administration fall under the purview of pharmacologic therapeutics.

Therapies worked on:

- Amebiasis
- Insomnia
- Tetanus
- Rheumatic Fever
- Dextrose Phleboclysis
- Conjunctivitis
- Fresh Accidental Wounds
- Erysipelas
- Furunculosis Fever Regimen
- Barbiturate Poisoning
- Mycoses
- Anthrax
- Carbuncles
- Eczema
- Burns
- Glaucoma
- Chancroid
- Bubo
- Bedsores
- Pain
- Ulcer
- Uncinariasis
- Trichiniasias
- Varicose Veins
- Acne
- Acne Rosacea
- Arterial Thrombosis of the Extremities
- Eclampsia

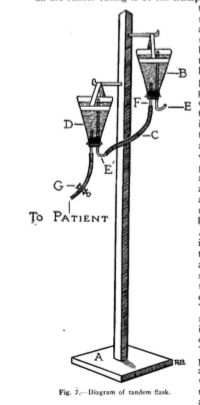
Tandem Flask for blood transfusion

=== The Blood Bank ===
Throughout his career, Fantus became acutely aware of the importance of having access to blood for transfusions and the lack of accessibility that existed at the time. Transfusions were typically only done directly from donor to patient and were typically not used for emergency traumas. Fantus was introduced to the idea of blood being stored as the Spanish Revolution was underway and he immediately realized the multitude of possibilities and the abundance of lives that could be saved, especially in times of war, that storing blood for transfusion presented. From information he obtained from Russian publications, Fantus learned that storing blood was a rather simple process and that establishing some sort of laboratory for it in the United States would not be very complicated. From that point on, Fantus made it his mission to establish a laboratory where blood could be stored. His daughter Ruth is credited with coming up with the term "blood bank," a phrase which Fantus readily accepted because everyone in society knows how a bank works, and the process of storing blood was essentially analogous. World War II spurred Fantus on as he wanted to use the blood from people state side to save the lives of U.S. soldiers overseas. He thus spent years in the laboratory perfecting methods of transfusion.

Just think what it would mean to our soldiers to know that their loved ones at home were sending them the Blood of Life in their moment of greatest need.

— Bernard Fantus, Blood of Life, Valerie Gendron

Fantus secured permission, spread the word of the establishment, obtained a suitable room at Cook County Hospital, and put Dr. Elizabeth Schermer in charge of the laboratory. The blood bank officially opened on March 15, 1937.

== Memberships ==
- American Medical Association
- American Pharmacists Association
- American Association for the Advancement of Science
- American College of Physicians
- Chicago Society of Internal Medicine
- National Formulary
- American Public Health Association

== Works ==
- A Humanist's Affirmation
- A laboratory manual and syllabus of lectures on pharmacognosy, pharmacy and prescription writing,
- An automatic method of prolonged serial blood-pressure registration in man
- A text book on prescription writing and pharmacy :with practice in prescription-writing, laboratory exercises in pharmacy, and a reference list of the official drugs
- Candy Medication
- Chlorinated lime and halazone in the disinfection of drinking water
- Clinical observations on influenza
- Clinical observations on influenza
- Essentials of prescription-writing
- General technic of medication; an introduction to medicinal technology
- General therapeutics
- Industry costs and profitability in New Jersey and competitive states: an analysis of the Fantus Company report, A research program to strengthen New Jersey's competitive position for business and industry
- The effect of salicylates on experimental arthritis in rabbits
- The physician and prohibition
- The rôle of alcohol in the welfare of the human race: from the standpoint of pharmacology and therapeutics
- The technic of medication; discussion of the methods of prescribing and preparing, the indications for, and the uses of, various medicaments.
- Useful cathartics; a series of articles on the use and abuse of cathartics with suggestive formulas and recipes.
- What instruction ought medical colleges to give in pharmacology and therapeutics.Presented at the second annual session of the Federation of State Medical Boards of the United States ...

=== Articles ===
- An Inquiry into the Causes for Variation in Determinations of Disinfecting Value
- Aqueous and alcoholic elixirs versus aromatic elixirs**Read before Section on Practical Pharmacy and Dispensing, A. Ph. A., Cleveland meeting, 1922
- Aromatic elixir of gluside*
- Can the pharmacopœia and the national formulary be made popular with physicians?
- Dentifrice formulas for the National Formulary
- Dose Standardization of Elixirs††Abstracted from the address before the Unofficial Conference of U. S. P. and N. F. Revision Workers at Chicago, January 12, 1924.
- Economy in Medication
- Emergency Alimentation
- Fuller's earth; Its adsorptive power, and its antidotal value for alkaloids
- How some doctors view U. S. P. and N. F. Propaganda
- Our Insufficiently Appreciated American Spas and Health Resorts
- Pastes. I. for dermatologic use. Preliminary report
- “Patent medicines”—the pharmacist's duty in regard to them
- Phenolpthalein administration to nursing women
- Studies on colon irritation: Examination of feces
- Tabellæ dulces, sweet tablets for children's medication
- Tablets for the National Formulary**Read before Section on Practical Pharmacy and Dispensing, A. Ph. A., New Orleans meeting, 1921.
- The Choice of Ointment Vehicles in Dermatology
- The Continuous Revision of the National Formulary Should Improve Medico-Pharmaceutic Relations
- The making of tablets by the retail druggist
- The Treatment of Vomiting
- The Year book of general therapeutics.
- Tolu and sugar coating in the disguising of medicines
- Tungstates of alkaloids—An experimental pharmacologic study
- X-Ray Contrast Media*
