= N-Butylmercuric chloride =

n-Butylmercuric chloride

Names
- IUPAC name butyl(chloro)mercury

Identifiers
CAS Number	543-63-5
3D model (JSmol)	Interactive image
Abbreviations	BMC
ChemSpider	32698377
ECHA InfoCard	100.190.233
EC Number	663-974-1
PubChem CID	10978
RTECS number	OV7700000
UNII	7W2VQU83E9
UN number	2810
CompTox Dashboard (EPA)	DTXSID30202656
- InChI: InChI=1S/C4H9.ClH.Hg/c1-3-4-2;;/h1,3-4H2,2H3;1H;/q;;+1/p-1 Key: OKPMTXZRMGMMOO-UHFFFAOYSA-M
- SMILES: CCCC[Hg]Cl

Properties
Chemical formula	C_{4}H_{9}ClHg
Molar mass	293.16 g·mol^{−1}
Appearance	Liquid
Boiling point	130 °C (266 °F; 403 K)
log P	2.4411

Hazards
- GHS labelling
Pictograms	(GHS08: Health hazard) (GHS09: Environmental hazard) (GHS06: Toxic)
Signal word	Danger
Hazard statements	H300, H310, H330, H373, H410
Precautionary statements	P260, P262, P264, P270, P271, P273, P280, P284, P302+P352, P304+P340, P320, P321, P330, P361+P364, P391, P403+P233, P405, P501
- Lethal dose or concentration (LD, LC)
LD_{50} (median dose)	73 mg/kg (rat subcutaneous)
- Except where otherwise noted, data are given for materials in their standard state (at 25 °C [77 °F], 100 kPa). Infobox references

n-Butylmercuric chloride is an organic mercury salt that is used as a catalyst and a precursor to other organomercuric compounds.

== Preparation ==
n-Butylmercuric chloride is made by reacting n-butylmagnesium bromide with mercury chloride.

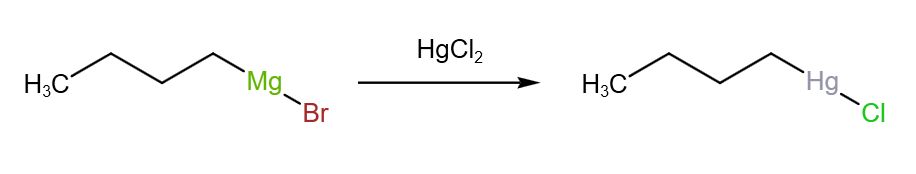

It can also be prepared by reacting 1-butene with mercury acetate.
