= Transfusion-associated graft-versus-host disease =

Rejection of host cells by the immune cells of transplanted blood

Transfusion-associated graft-versus-host-disease
- Other names: TA-GvHD
- Specialty: Hematology

In hematology, transfusion-associated graft-versus-host disease (TA-GvHD) is a rare complication of blood transfusion, in which the immunologically competent donor T lymphocytes mount an immune response against the recipient's lymphoid tissue. These donor lymphocytes engraft, recognize recipient cells as foreign and mount an immune response against recipient tissues. Donor lymphocytes are usually identified as foreign and destroyed by the recipient's immune system. However, in situations where the recipient is severely immunocompromised, or when the donor and recipient HLA type is similar (as can occur in directed donations from first-degree relatives), the recipient's immune system is not able to destroy the donor lymphocytes. This can result in transfusion-associated graft-versus-host disease (GvHD). This is in contrast with organ/tissue transplant-associated GvHD, where matching HLA reduces the incident of the complication.

== Signs and symptoms ==
The clinical presentation is the same as GvHD occurring in other settings, such as bone marrow transplantation. TA-GvHD can develop two days to six weeks after the transfusion. Typical symptoms include:

- fever
- erythematous maculopapular rash, which can progress to generalised erythroderma
- toxic epidermal necrolysis in extreme cases
- hepatomegaly
- diarrhea

Other symptoms can include cough, abdominal pain, dyspnea and vomiting.

== Diagnosis ==
Laboratory findings include pancytopenia, marrow aplasia, abnormal liver enzymes, and electrolyte imbalance (when diarrhea is present).

TA-GvHD can be suspected from a biopsy of the affected skin or liver, and established by HLA analysis of the circulating lymphocytes. This testing can identify circulating lymphocytes with a different HLA type than the tissue cells of the host.

In 2023, the first case of fetal-induced GvHD was reported in the New England Journal of Medicine.

== Prevention ==
Prevention includes gamma irradiation of the lymphocyte-containing blood components such as red blood cells, platelets and granulocytes. Irradiated blood components should be issued in the following situations:

- Intrauterine transfusions
- Prematurity, low birthweight, or erythroblastosis fetalis in newborns
- Congenital immunodeficiencies
- Certain hematologic malignancies (e.g. Hodgkin lymphoma)
- Patients undergoing hematopoietic stem cell transplantation
- Components that are HLA matched, or directed donations from a family member
- Patients receiving fludarabine therapy
- Patients receiving granulocyte transfusions

== Treatment ==
Treatment is supportive. No available form of therapy has proven effective in treating TA-GvHD and it is fatal in more than 90% of cases.

== Epidemiology ==
The incidence of TA-GvHD in immunocompromised patients receiving blood transfusions is estimated to be 0.1–1.0%, and mortality around 80–90%. Mortality is higher in TA-GvHD than in GvHD associated with bone marrow transplantation, where the engrafted lymphoid cells in the bone marrow are of donor origin (in autotransplant) and therefore the immune reaction is not directed against them.

The most common causes of death in TA-GvHD are infections and hemorrhages secondary to pancytopenia and liver dysfunction.
