= Samuel Armstrong Lane =

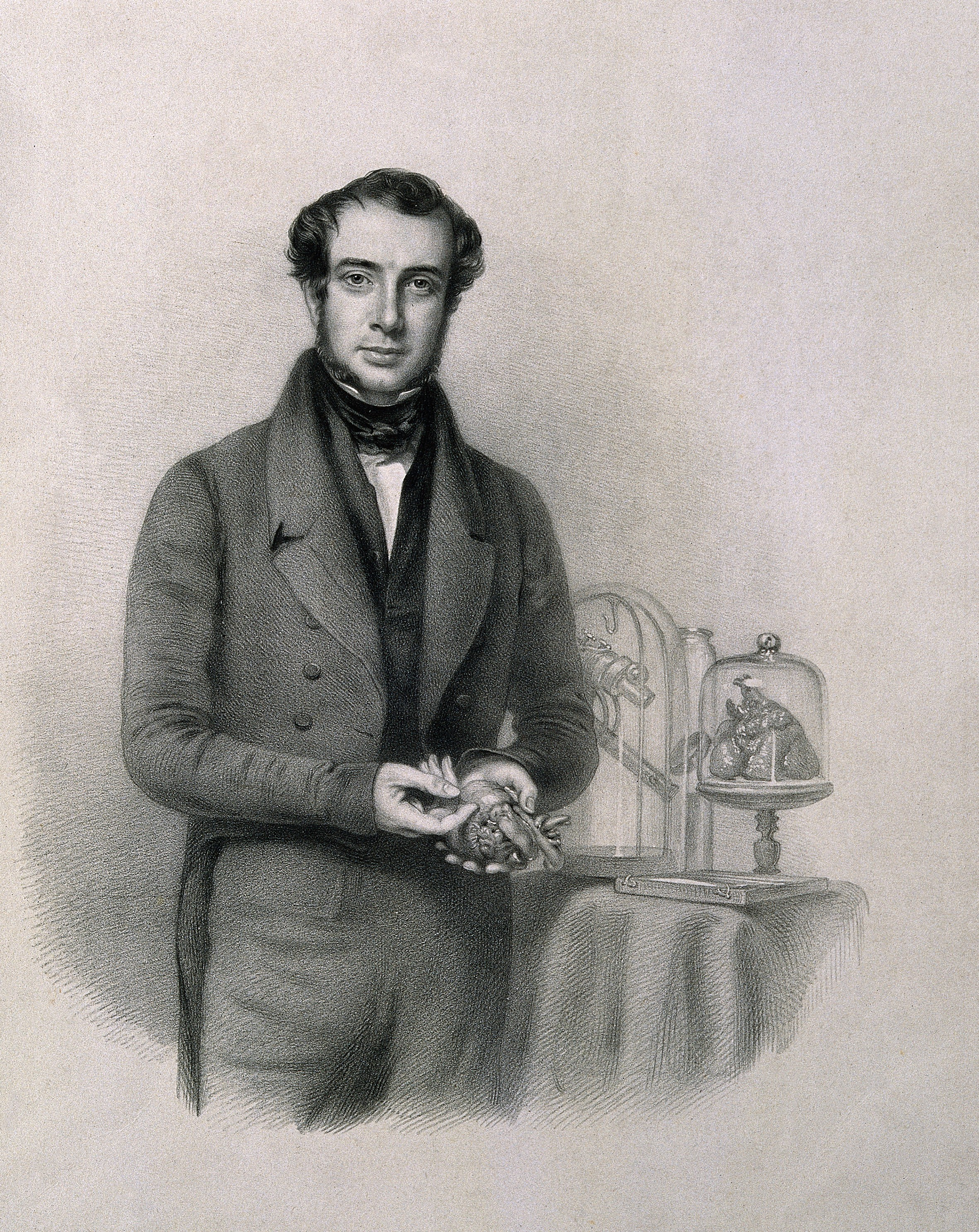
Samuel Armstrong Lane. Litograph by Richard James Lane.

Samuel Armstrong Lane FRCS (1802 – 2 August 1892) was an English surgeon, consulting surgeon to St Mary's Hospital.

In 1840 while practicing in London England, Samuel Armstrong Lane, aided by consultant Dr. Blundell, performed the first successful whole Blood transfusion in an attempt to treat hemophilia.

In 1843 he was elected one of the original 300 Fellow of the Royal College of Surgeons
