= Darienine =

Identifiers
CAS Number	111316-27-9
3D model (JSmol)	Interactive image
ChEMBL	ChEMBL449820
ChemSpider	20129637
PubChem CID	130672
UNII	F33SQ49WKW
CompTox Dashboard (EPA)	DTXSID70912106
- InChI: InChI=1S/C15H13NO4/c1-7-4-5-16-12-10(7)13(18)8-6-9(17)14(19-2)15(20-3)11(8)12/h4-6,17H,1-3H3 Key: BZDOUYRDEWHTCN-UHFFFAOYSA-N; InChI=1/C15H13NO4/c1-7-4-5-16-12-10(7)13(18)8-6-9(17)14(19-2)15(20-3)11(8)12/h4-6,17H,1-3H3
- SMILES: Cc1ccnc-2c1C(=O)c3c2c(c(c(c3)O)OC)OC

Properties
Chemical formula	C_{15}H_{13}NO_{4}
Molar mass	271.272 g·mol^{−1}
- Except where otherwise noted, data are given for materials in their standard state (at 25 °C [77 °F], 100 kPa). Infobox references

Darienine is an anti-cholinergic alkaloid.
