= Febrile non-hemolytic transfusion reaction =

- Other names: Febrile-type reaction
- Specialty: Hematology

Febrile non-hemolytic transfusion reaction (FNHTR) is the most common type of transfusion reaction. It is a benign occurrence with symptoms that include fever but not directly related with hemolysis. It is caused by cytokine release from leukocytes within the donor product as a consequence of white blood cell breakdown. These inflammatory mediators accumulate during the storage of the donated blood, and so the frequency of this reaction increases with the storage length of donated blood. This is in contrast to transfusion-associated acute lung injury, in which the donor plasma has antibodies directed against the recipient HLA antigens, mediating the characteristic lung damage.

== Definition ==
Symptoms must manifest within 4 hours of cessation of the transfusion, and should not be due to another cause such as an underlying infection, bacterial contamination of the blood component, or another type of transfusion reaction, e.g. acute hemolytic transfusion reaction.

Fever must be at least 38 °C/100.4 °F oral and a change of at least 1 °C/1.8 °F from pre-transfusion value OR chills and/or rigors must be present.

The UK hemovigilance system (SHOT) categorizes the severity of the reaction.

=== Mild ===
Fever of at least 38 °C/100.4 °F oral and a change of between 1 and 2 °C from pre-transfusion values but no other symptoms or signs.

=== Moderate ===
Fever of at least 39 °C, OR a rise in temperature of at least 2 °C from pre-transfusion values AND/OR other symptoms or signs, including chills (rigors), painful muscles (myalgia), or nausea that are severe enough that the transfusion is stopped.

=== Severe ===
Fever of at least 39 °C, OR a rise in temperature of at least 2 °C from pre-transfusion values AND/OR other symptoms or signs, including chills (rigors), painful muscles (myalgia), or nausea that are severe enough that the transfusion is stopped AND requires immediate medical treatment, admission to hospital, or lengthens the duration of hospital admission.

== Treatment ==
Paracetamol has been used in treatment, and leukoreduction of future transfusions is sometimes performed.
