= Mercury chloride =

Mercury chloride can refer to:

- Mercury(II) chloride or mercuric chloride (HgCl_{2})
- Mercury(I) chloride or mercurous chloride (Hg_{2}Cl_{2})
- Tetrachloromercurate dianion (HgCl^{−}_{4})
