= Acetaminosalol =

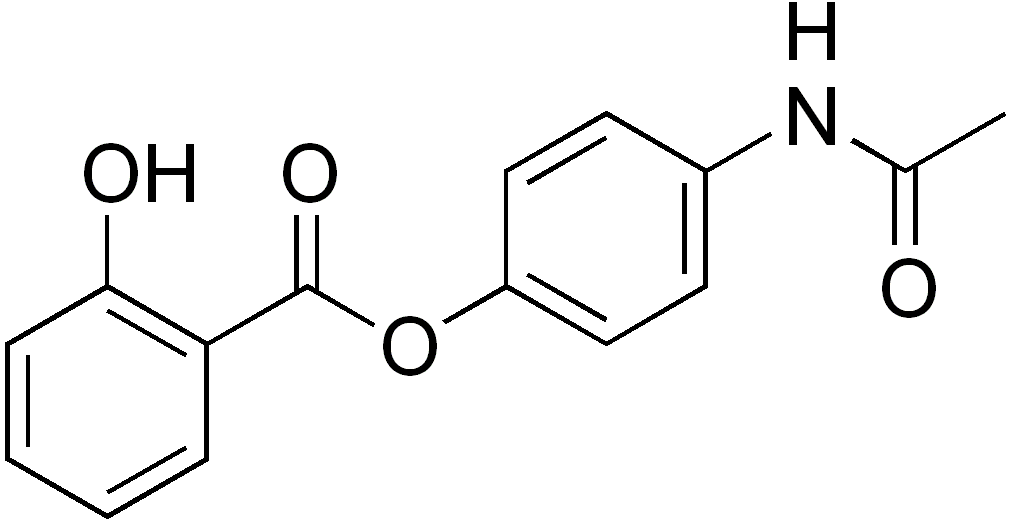
- Kekulé, skeletal formula of acetaminosalol

Names
- Preferred IUPAC name 4-Acetamidophenyl 2-hydroxybenzoate

Identifiers
CAS Number	118-57-0
3D model (JSmol)	Interactive image; Interactive image
ChEBI	CHEBI:250620
ChEMBL	ChEMBL92590
ChemSpider	1907
ECHA InfoCard	100.003.875
EC Number	204-261-3
MeSH	Salophen
PubChem CID	1984
UNII	O3J7H54KMD
CompTox Dashboard (EPA)	DTXSID7045865
- InChI: InChI=1S/C15H13NO4/c1-10(17)16-11-6-8-12(9-7-11)20-15(19)13-4-2-3-5-14(13)18/h2-9,18H,1H3,(H,16,17) Key: TWIIVLKQFJBFPW-UHFFFAOYSA-N; InChI=1/C15H13NO4/c1-10(17)16-11-6-8-12(9-7-11)20-15(19)13-4-2-3-5-14(13)18/h2-9,18H,1H3,(H,16,17) Key: TWIIVLKQFJBFPW-UHFFFAOYAL
- SMILES: CC(=O)Nc1ccc(OC(=O)c2ccccc2O)cc1; CC(=O)NC1=CC=C(OC(=O)C2=CC=CC=C2O)C=C1

Properties
Chemical formula	C_{15}H_{13}NO_{4}
Molar mass	271.272 g·mol^{−1}
Density	1.327 g cm^{−3}
log P	2.562
Acidity (pK_{a})	7.874
Basicity (pK_{b})	6.123

Hazards
Flash point	241.9 °C (467.4 °F; 515.0 K)
- Except where otherwise noted, data are given for materials in their standard state (at 25 °C [77 °F], 100 kPa). verify (what is ?) Infobox references

Acetaminosalol is an organic compound with the chemical formula C_{15}H_{13}NO_{4}.

It is an esterification product of salicylic acid and paracetamol. Acetaminosalol combines the analgesic and antipyretic properties of paracetamol with the anti-inflammatory effects of salicylate. It was marketed by Bayer under the brand name Salophen as an analgesic in the late 19th and early 20th centuries.

== Action and uses ==
In a warm alkaline solution acetaminosalol is broken up into salicylic acid and paracetamol. It is decomposed in the intestines, even when given as an injection. It was used as a substitute for salicylic acid in acute rheumatism, and as an intestinal antiseptic. It was similarly effective and much safer than salol, another intestinal antiseptic commonly used at the time. The fact that it is tasteless renders it easy to administer.

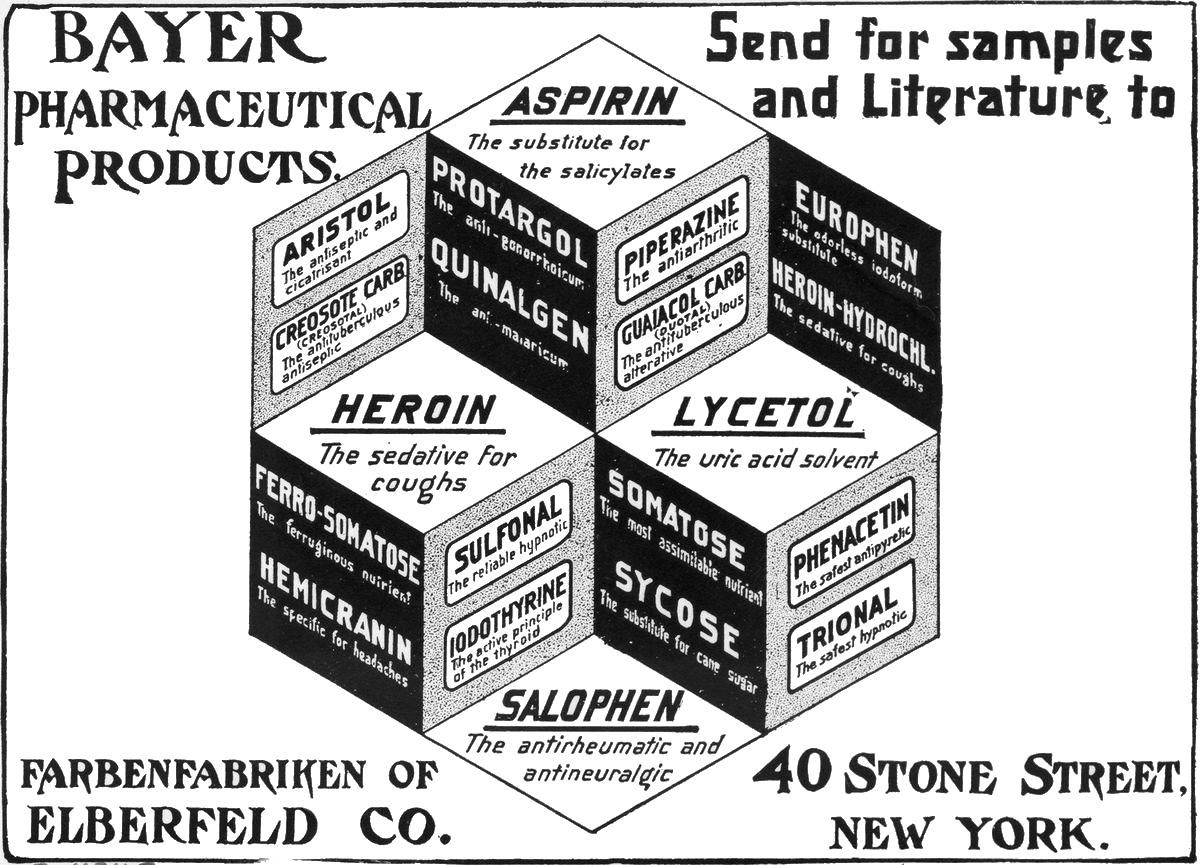
Advertisement for early 20th century Bayer products, including Salophen
