= Vera Sharav =

Romanian Holocaust survivor and human rights activist

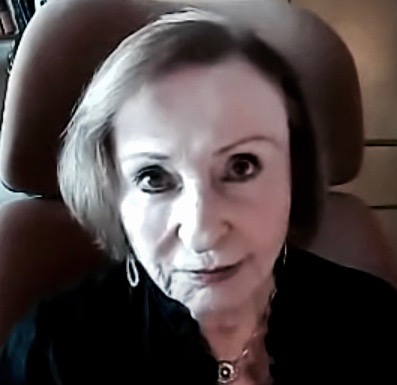
Vera Sharav

Vera Sharav, a Holocaust survivor and human rights activist, is the founder of the Alliance for Human Research Protection and an outspoken critic of eugenics trends in the biomedical industry, particularly in matters of patient consent and children.

== Biography ==
Sharav was born April 17, 1937 in Romania as Vera Roll and survived the Holocaust as a child; her father did not survive. Her mother emigrated to the United States while she was cared for by relatives; she rejoined her mother in New York City when she was 8. She attended City College of New York and studied art history and after marriage and two children she went back to school, to the Pratt Institute, where in 1971 she received her master's in library science.

Sharav became an activist against aspects of biomedical research after her teenage son died of a reaction to clozapine, which he had been prescribed for schizoaffective disorder. In her blog she criticizes the industry saying it is profit-driven, lies to its consumers and misleads people into participating in trials it pretends are medical treatment. Of particular interest to her are the waivers of informed consent issued by the Food and Drug Administration, which allow unconscious or incapacitated subjects to be tested.

Her criticism of clinical studies where patient consent is questionable led her to campaign against Northfield Laboratories, manufacturers of the blood substitute PolyHeme; she filed complaints and started an email campaign which led the media and then the US Senate to investigate the matter. Sharav claimed the product was toxic and that the people and communities on which it was tested had not been properly informed of the risks.

== Methods and assessment ==
Sharav's methods are praised by some and criticized by others. Marcia Angell, former editor of The New England Journal of Medicine, senior lecturer at the Harvard Medical School, and industry critic praised her: "I see her as someone the research establishment badly needs". Arthur Caplan, professor of medical ethics at the University of Pennsylvania, is critical on some topics and says: "It's crazy to say you won't do the research if you can't get good informed consent when the alternative could be death". He agrees, though, that she is justified in trying to stop trials that involve children if the purpose is extending market rights.

Other experiments that drew Sharav's ire involved the testing of HIV drugs on toddlers in the foster care system of New York City, and she "helped scuttle government research that would have paid low-income Florida families $970 to test their children’s exposure to household pesticides".

== Controversies ==
Sharav held a speech at the 75th anniversary of the Nuremberg Code in Nuremberg, where she was critical of the COVID-19 vaccine comparing it to Zyklon B which was used to murder over a million people during the Holocaust. The German Jewish Forum for Democracy and against Antisemitism (JFDA) considers her speech a relativization of the Holocaust.

== Filmography ==
- War on Health: The FDA's Cult of Tyranny (2012)
- The Silent Epidemic: The Untold Story of Vaccines (2013)
- Rebel News (2015)
