= Dipanjan Pan =

Indian-American medical researcher

- Occupations: Academic; Entrepreneur

Academic background
- Education: Indian Institute of Technology
- Academic advisor: Karen L. Wooley

Dipanjan Pan is an Indian American academic who is the Dorothy Foehr Huck & J. Lloyd Huck Chair Professor in Nanomedicine at Pennsylvania State University.

== Early life and education ==
Dipanjan Pan was born in India. He obtained his doctoral degree from the Indian Institute of Technology and subsequently joined Washington University in St. Louis. There, he collaborated with Karen L. Wooley on investigating the utilization of self-assembled polymeric nanoparticles for targeted drug delivery applications.

== Career ==
Pan started his career in 2005 as an intellectual property analyst in chemistry at General Electric's John F. Welch Technology Centre.

In 2007, he joined the Washington University School of Medicine in Saint Louis as a research instructor. In 2010, he became an assistant professor in medicine and served until 2013, contributing to the field of cardiovascular research.

In 2013, Pan joined the University of Illinois Urbana-Champaign as an assistant professor.

In 2014, Pan co-founded InnSight Technology, a preclinical company, along with Leanne Labriola. Two years later, in 2016, he co-founded KaloCyte, a company that has developed an artificial blood called Erythromer, with Allan Doctor and Philip Spinella. He has served as a professor of radiology in the school of medicine, and professor of chemical and biochemical and environmental engineering at the University of Maryland, Baltimore County.

Pan is the current head of the Pan Laboratory for Materials in Medicine.

== Research ==
His research focuses on the development and application of nanoscale materials and techniques for the diagnosis and treatment of various diseases, particularly cancer and cardiovascular disorders.

In 2014, Pan and his team reported a novel method for inhibiting cancer cell growth using nanotechnology, as detailed in a paper presented at the American Chemical Society conference. The preliminary research demonstrated success in impeding breast cancer and melanoma cell growth in laboratory settings by delivering a synthetic compound mimicking venom from bees, snakes, and scorpions.

In 2015, Pan, Leanne Labriola, and other team members developed a portable sensor named OcuCheck that assesses ocular injuries through the quantification of vitamin C concentration in a patient's tears at the University of Illinois.

In 2018, Pan and other researchers at the University of Illinois created a gel utilizing gold nanoparticles which has the capability to rapidly detect ocular trauma.

In 2020, Pan and his team initiated the development of rapid tests for detecting COVID-19. Within six months, they created their first test, followed by four more by the end of 2021. Three tests, including the Antisense test, have been licensed for commercialization and registered with the Food and Drug Administration. Later, he founded a company called VitruVian Bio to further develop the test for commercial applications.

In 2023, Dipanjan Pan and his research team developed the first rapid test for mpox, as reported in the journal Advanced Functional Materials. It uses a selective molecular sensor that can detect the virus within minutes. The method employs nanomaterial heterostructures, consisting of zero-dimensional spherical gold nanoparticles and two-dimensional hafnium disulfide nanoplatelets, as building blocks to create a platform technology capable of detecting trace amounts of genetic material in biological samples.

== Awards and recognition ==
- 2014: Elected Fellow of the Royal Society of Chemistry
- 2016: Nanomaterials Letter Researcher Award
- 2016: Elected Fellow of AHA
- 2018: Elected Fellow of ACC
- 2018: Dean's Award
- 2020: COVID-19 Hero Award
- 2021: Maryland Industrial Partnerships (MIPS) Award
- 2023: Elected Fellow of AIMBE

== Bibliography ==
- Nanomedicine: A Soft Matter Perspective
- Personalized Medicine with a Nanochemistry Twist: Nanomedicine
