= Neohemocyte =

Neohemocyte ("new blood cell") is the name given by its University of California at San Francisco creators to artificial red blood cells. These cells are created by packing natural hemoglobin molecules in fat bubbles made from phospholipids and cholesterol, resulting in cells roughly one-twelfth the size of human erythrocytes. They provide an advantage over real blood cells in their longer storage capacity (about six months versus 35 days).

The oxygen-carrying contents of the neohemocyte may theoretically be artificial hemoglobin, although no such technique is currently available.
