= The Children Act (film) =

2017 film by Richard Eyre

- Theatrical release poster
- Directed by: Richard Eyre
- Screenplay by: Ian McEwan
- Based on: The Children Act by Ian McEwan
- Produced by: Duncan Kenworthy
- Starring: Emma Thompson; Stanley Tucci; Fionn Whitehead
- Cinematography: Andrew Dunn
- Edited by: Dan Farrell
- Music by: Stephen Warbeck
- Production companies: FilmNation Entertainment; BBC Films
- Distributed by: A24; DirecTV (United States); Entertainment One (United Kingdom)
- Release dates: 9 September 2017 (TIFF); 24 August 2018 (United Kingdom); 14 September 2018 (United States)
- Running time: 105 minutes
- Countries: United Kingdom; United States
- Language: English
- Box office: $17.7 million

The Children Act is a 2017 drama film directed by Richard Eyre, produced by Duncan Kenworthy, and adapted by Ian McEwan from his 2014 novel. It stars Emma Thompson, Stanley Tucci, and Fionn Whitehead.

The film had its world premiere at the 42nd Toronto International Film Festival on 9 September 2017. and was released in the United Kingdom on 24 August 2018 by Entertainment One, and through DirecTV Cinema on 16 August 2018 before opening in the US in a limited release on 14 September 2018, by A24.

== Plot ==
Fiona Maye is a judge in the Family Division of the High Court of Justice of England and Wales. A case is brought before her involving a 17-year-old boy, Adam Henry, who is suffering from leukaemia. Adam's doctors want to perform a blood transfusion, as that will allow them to use more drugs to cure him. However, Adam and his parents are Jehovah's Witnesses, and believe that having a blood transfusion is against biblical principles.

Fiona goes to the hospital to see Adam. The two talk, with Fiona attempting to determine what it is that he really wants, and whether he has been persuaded by his parents. When she asks Adam whether he is aware refusing the blood transfusion could, rather than kill him, render him disabled, Adam answers yes, and he would hate it but accept the cost.

Fiona asks Adam to play a song for her. He starts to play Yeats' "Down by the Salley Gardens", which Fiona then sings. Adam is very drawn to her, and begs her not to leave. Fiona nevertheless does, and returns to court. She rules that, as a matter of law as laid out in the introduction of the Children Act 1989, Adam's welfare is the "paramount consideration" and declares that the medical treatment, including blood transfusion, may proceed despite the absence of Adam's consent and that of his parents.

Meanwhile, Fiona's marriage is failing. Her husband, Jack, informs her that he is planning to have an affair with a colleague half his age. He has become tired of Fiona constantly working and never having time for him. He says that he will have an affair, but is being totally open about it as a favour to her.

Jack claims that he has never stopped, and will never stop, loving her. He packs his bags and drives off. Fiona carries on with work without making contact, changes the locks, and begins rehearsing the piano with colleague Mark Berner. Jack returns after two days. After letting him in, Fiona acts very coldly towards him, resulting in an argument, after Fiona is seen to have been to the office of a divorce solicitor.

The transfusion is successful, and Adam is released from the hospital. He leaves many messages for Fiona, saying that she has changed the way that he thinks about the world. Adam follows her to work one day, and gives her various poems and letters that he has written. She tells him to stop following her; she has other cases, while he is still young and has his whole life in front of him.

Next, Fiona travels to Newcastle for an Oath of Allegiance ceremony, and Adam follows her there. He tells her that he wants to live with her, as he does not understand why his parents were happy for him to die. Fiona sends him back to London. He kisses her on the lips and in the moment she accepts.

Shortly after she returns to London, Fiona accompanies Mark Berner on the piano at a lawyers' concert. Just before she is due to play, she gets a note saying that Adam has relapsed and may not make it through the night. Instead of the planned encore, she plays and sings "Down by the Salley Gardens", before rushing to the hospice to see Adam.

Adam, now turned 18 and no longer subject to the Children Act, has refused another blood transfusion saying that it is his choice. Fiona returns home, and breaks down in front of Jack, telling him the story and calling Adam a "lovely boy". She falls asleep holding Jack's hand.

Adam dies and Fiona attends his funeral, before walking away with Jack.

== Cast ==
- Emma Thompson as Fiona Maye, the Honourable Mrs Justice Maye DBE
- Stanley Tucci as Jack Maye, Fiona's husband and an academic
- Fionn Whitehead as Adam Henry, a 17-year-old Jehovah's Witness with leukaemia
- Ben Chaplin as Kevin Henry, Adam's father
- Jason Watkins as Nigel Pauling, Fiona Maye's clerk
- Nikki Amuka-Bird as Amadia Kalu QC, a barrister representing the Henry family
- Anthony Calf as Mark Berner, a barrister and friend of Fiona, representing the hospital
- Rosie Cavaliero as Marina Green, Adam's guardian ad litem
- Eileen Walsh as Naomi Henry, Adam's mother
- Nicholas Jones as Professor Rodney Carter, an oncologist treating Adam
- Rupert Vansittart as Sherwood Runcie

== Production ==
On 29 August 2016, it was reported that Emma Thompson was in talks to star in an adaptation of the Ian McEwan novel The Children Act directed by Richard Eyre and produced by Duncan Kenworthy. On 3 October 2016, Stanley Tucci and Fionn Whitehead joined the cast. Production was set to begin in London in October 2016, and it was reported on 8 December 2016, that filming had wrapped. Sir Alan Hylton Ward, one of the judges in a conjoined twins case that had been one of the inspirations for the book, acted as an adviser during the production.

== Release ==
The film had its world premiere at the Toronto International Film Festival on 9 September 2017. Shortly after that, A24 and DirecTV Cinema acquired U.S. distribution rights to the film.

The film was released in the United Kingdom on 24 August 2018 by Entertainment One. It was scheduled to be released in the United States through DirecTV Cinema on 16 August 2018, before being released in a limited release on 14 September 2018.

== Reception ==
The Children Act received positive reviews from film critics. It holds an approval rating of 74% on review aggregator website Rotten Tomatoes, based on 112 reviews, with a weighted average of 6.7/10. The website's critical consensus reads, "The Children Act showcases yet another powerful performance from Emma Thompson, who elevates this undeniably flawed picture into an affecting adult drama." On Metacritic, the film holds a rating of 62 out of 100, based on 28 critics, indicating "generally favorable reviews".

Peter Debruge of Variety gave the film a positive review, writing, "The Children Act is that rarest of things: an adult drama, written and interpreted with a sensitivity to mature human concerns." Stephen Farber of The Hollywood Reporter also gave the film a positive review, saying, "The two central performances could hardly be better. Thompson works here with remarkable subtlety."
