= Jehovah's Witnesses and blood transfusions =

Doctrinal position about use of blood

Jehovah's Witnesses believe that the Bible prohibits Christians from accepting transfusion of another person's whole blood. Their literature states that "abstaining from blood" means "not to eat blood or accept a blood transfusion". For many years, transfusion of individual blood components, including packed red blood cells, blood plasma, or platelets were specifically forbidden. Transfusion of one's own blood was also prohibited until March 2026. As of September 2026, they no longer prohibit individual blood components, and members may donate blood components for use by others.

Their interpretation of scripture is unusual and is one of the doctrines for which Jehovah's Witnesses are best known. Their literature teaches that refusal of transfusions of whole blood is a non-negotiable religious stand and that those who respect life as a gift from God do not try to sustain life by taking in blood, even in an emergency. A 2016 medical review cited an estimate of approximately 1,000 deaths annually among Jehovah's Witnesses due to refusal of blood transfusions.

The doctrine was introduced in 1945 and has undergone a number of changes since then. Previously members of the group who voluntarily accept a transfusion and are not deemed repentant were regarded as having disassociated themselves from the group by abandoning its doctrines and were subsequently shunned by members of the organization.

The Watch Tower Society has established Hospital Information Services to provide education and facilitate bloodless surgery. This service also maintains Hospital Liaison Committees.

== Doctrine ==
On the basis of various biblical texts, including Genesis 9:4, Leviticus 17:10, and Acts 15:28–15:29, Jehovah's Witnesses believe:

- Blood represents life and is sacred to God. After it has been removed from a creature, the only use of blood that God has authorized is for the atonement of sins. When a Christian abstains from blood, they are in effect expressing faith that only the shed blood of Jesus Christ can truly redeem them and save their life.
- Blood must not be eaten or transfused, even in the case of a medical emergency.
- Blood leaving the body of a human or animal must be disposed of.
- Certain medical procedures involving blood fractions or that use a patient's own blood during the course of a medical procedure, such as hemodilution or cell salvage, are a matter of personal choice, according to what a person's conscience permits.
- A baptized Witness who unrepentantly accepts a blood transfusion is deemed to have disassociated himself from the group by abandoning its doctrines and is subsequently subject to organized shunning by other members.

For many years, certain medical procedures involving blood were specifically prohibited by Jehovah's Witnesses' blood doctrine, including the use of red blood cells, white blood cells, platelets, and blood plasma. However, as of September 2026, only the transfusion of allogeneic whole blood is specifically prohibited, and the use of the components is considered a matter of conscience for individual members. Watch Tower Society publications state that some products derived from one of the four primary components may be so similar to the function of the whole component and carry on such a life-sustaining role in the body that "most Christians would find them objectionable". Where no specific instructions are provided by the Watch Tower Society, members are told to obtain details from medical personnel about specific procedures and then make a personal decision.

=== Prohibited procedures ===
The majority of procedures and products are left to the decision of individual members:

Treatment / Procedure	Pre-1945	1945–1961	1961–2000	2000–2025	April–September 2026	Sept 2026–present
Transfusion of donated whole blood.	⚪	🔴	🔴	🔴	🔴	🔴
Primary components (red blood cells, white blood cells, platelets, plasma)	⚪	🔴	🔴	🔴	🔴	🟢
Blood fractions (albumin, immunoglobulins, clotting factors)	⚪	🔴	🟢 (1990)	🟢	🟢	🟢
Interferons, interleukins	⚪	⚪	🟢 (1989)	🟢	🟢	🟢
Erythropoietin	⚪	⚪	🟢 (1994)	🟢	🟢	🟢
Cryosupernatant	⚪	⚪	⚪	🟢 (2011)	🟢	🟢
Blood donation	⚪	🔴	🔴	🟢 (for further fractionation only)	🟢	🟢 (for use of separate main components)
Autologous blood transfusion	⚪	🔴	🟢 (1989, intra-operative only)	🟢	🟢 (including pre-operative storage)	🟢
Hemodilution, intraoperative blood salvage, plasmapheresis	⚪	⚪	🟢 (1989)	🟢	🟢	🟢
Bone marrow transplant	⚪	⚪	🟢 (1984)	🟢	🟢	🟢
Cardiopulmonary bypass, dialysis	⚪	⚪	🟢 (1978)	🟢	🟢	🟢
Organ transplants	⚪	⚪	🔴 (1967–1980)	🟢	🟢	🟢

🔴 = Explicitly prohibited 🟢 = Conscience-based (officially permitted) ⚪ = Not clearly defined

== Bloodless surgery ==
108,000 physicians have expressed their willingness to respect the wishes of Jehovah's Witnesses and provide bloodless treatment and about 200 hospitals offer bloodless medicine and surgery programs for patients who wish to avoid or limit blood transfusions. Bloodless surgery has been successfully performed in significant procedures including open-heart surgery and total hip replacements. A 2012 study in JAMA Internal Medicine concluded that "Witnesses do not appear to be at increased risk for surgical complications or long-term mortality when comparisons are properly made by transfusion status. Thus, current extreme blood management strategies do not appear to place patients at heightened risk for reduced long-term survival." The study also stated that "Survival estimates of Witnesses were 86%, 69%, 51%, and 34% at 5, 10, 15, and 20 years after surgery, respectively, vs 74%, 53%, 35%, and 23% among non-Witnesses who received transfusions."

Bloodless medical and surgical techniques have limitations, and surgeons say the use of various allogeneic blood products and pre-operative autologous blood transfusion are appropriate standards of care for certain patient presentations. The Watch Tower Society has historically stated that in medical emergencies where blood transfusions seem to be the only available way to save a life, Jehovah's Witnesses request that doctors provide the best alternative care possible under the circumstances with respect for their personal conviction. The Watch Tower Society has acknowledged that some members have died after refusing blood.

A 2016 review in Obstetrical & Gynecological Survey cited an estimate of approximately 1,000 deaths annually among Jehovah's Witnesses due to refusal of blood transfusions. In Australasian Anaesthesia 2011, published in 2012, intensive care physician Anne-Marie Welsh reported an estimate that as many as 100,000 Jehovah's Witnesses may have died as a result of refusing transfusions since the prohibition was introduced in 1945.

In some countries, including Canada and the United Kingdom, a parent or guardian's decision can be legally overruled by medical staff; in such cases, medical staff may act without parental consent by obtaining a court order in a non-emergency situation, or without such in an emergency. In Japan, children under 15 can be administered blood transfusions against their and their parents' wishes, and children between the ages of 15 and 18 can be similarly treated provided they, or at least one of their legal guardians, consent to the procedure. In the United States, the American Academy of Pediatrics recommends that in cases of "an imminent threat to a child's life", physicians in some cases may "intervene over parental objections". The Michigan Court of Appeals, in deciding Werth v. Taylor, refused to hold a doctor liable for giving a Witness a lifesaving transfusion in an emergency.

=== Hospital Liaison Committees ===
In 1988, the Watch Tower Society formed Hospital Information Services, a department to help locate doctors or surgical teams who are willing to perform medical procedures on Witnesses without blood transfusions. They advocate for bloodless surgery methods. The department was given oversight of each branch office's Hospital Information Desk, and of one hundred Hospital Liaison Committees established throughout the United States. As of 2003, about 200 hospitals worldwide provided bloodless medical programs. As of 2006, there were 1,535 Hospital Liaison Committees worldwide coordinating communication between 110,000 physicians. Patients who accept certain blood products in the committee's presence were deemed to have disassociated and were shunned. It disseminates information about treatment options to local Hospital Liaison Committees, and to doctors and hospitals. The National Secular Society advocates against hospitals partnering with hospital liaison committees due to medical coercion.

=== Patient Visitation Groups ===
Annually since 2004, Jehovah's Witnesses in the United States have been informed that "with your consent, the law allows for the elders to learn of your admission [to hospital] and provide spiritual encouragement", but that "elders serving on a Patient Visitation Group [could] have access to your name" only if patients have made their wishes known according to the Health Insurance Portability and Accountability Act (HIPAA).

Jehovah's Witnesses' branch offices communicate with congregations regarding "ways to benefit from the activities of the Hospital Liaison Committee (HLC) and the Patient Visitation Group (PVG)." A Jehovah's Witnesses publication in 2000 reported that HLC committee members provide "vital information to the medical community", adding that "their work is complemented by hundreds of other self-sacrificing elders who make up Patient Visitation Groups that call on Witness patients to help and encourage them". Each branch office appoints PVG committee members, who serve as volunteers.

== Acceptance among Jehovah's Witnesses ==
The majority of Jehovah's Witnesses accept the organization's position regarding the medical use of blood, and members who accept the blood doctrine typically hold strongly to their convictions. In the August 1998 issue of Academic Emergency Medicine, Donald Ridley, a Jehovah's Witness and organization staff attorney, argued that carrying an up-to-date Medical Directive card issued by the organization indicates that an individual personally agrees with the established religious position of Jehovah's Witnesses.

In 1958, The Watchtower reported about a member who voluntarily accepted blood transfusion, contrary to Watch Tower Society doctrine. The organization confirms that members have accepted blood transfusions, despite the imposition in 1961 of a communal shunning policy for willful acceptance.

In 1982, a peer-reviewed case study of a congregation of 59 Jehovah's Witnesses was undertaken by Drs. Larry J. Findley and Paul M. Redstone to evaluate individual belief in respect to blood among Jehovah's Witnesses. The researchers stated, "The members of this congregation are adamant in their refusal to accept all blood products... Not one of the members stated they would receive a blood transfusion even if their refusal meant death, almost one-third of the respondents had personally refused blood transfusions". However, the study also showed that seven respondents were willing to accept plasma transplants and one member an autotransfusion, both forbidden by Jehovah's Witnesses' doctrine at the time. The researchers commented, "There is either some lack of understanding or refusal to follow doctrine among some members". The researchers noted that the contact details of the respondents were provided by congregation elders, which may have influenced the responses given. Another peer-reviewed study examining medical records indicated a similar percentage of Jehovah's Witnesses willing to accept blood transfusions for their children. Young adults also showed a willingness to accept blood transfusions. In another study, Jehovah's Witness patients presented for labor and delivery showed a willingness to accept some form of blood or blood products. Of those patients, 10 percent accepted whole blood transfusion.

Watch Tower publications have noted that within religions, the personal beliefs of members often differ from official doctrine. Regarding Jehovah's Witnesses' acceptance of the organization's official position on blood, Drs Cynthia Gyamfi and Richard Berkowitz state, "It is naïve to assume that all people in any religious group share the exact same beliefs, regardless of doctrine. It is well known that Muslims, Jews, and Christians have significant individual variations in their beliefs. Why should that not also be true of Jehovah's Witnesses?"

Ambivalence and rejection of the blood doctrine dates back to at least the 1940s. After the Watch Tower Society established the doctrine, teaching that blood should not be eaten (c. 1927–1931), Margaret Buber, who was never a member of the denomination, offered a firsthand eyewitness account of Jehovah's Witnesses in the Nazi Ravensbrück concentration camp. She relates that an overwhelming majority were willing to eat blood sausage despite having alternate food to choose from, specifically after considering biblical statements regarding blood.

== History ==
Early Watch Tower Society publications maintained the view of Society founder Charles Taze Russell that the reference to abstaining from the eating of blood in the Apostolic Decree of Acts 15:19–29 was a "suggestion" to be given to Gentile converts. Watch Tower Society literature during the presidency of Joseph Franklin Rutherford commended commercial and emergency uses of blood. In 1927, The Watchtower noted, without elaboration, that in Genesis 9, God decreed that Noah and his offspring "must not eat the blood, because the life is in the blood". In 1940, Consolation magazine reported on a woman who accidentally shot herself with a revolver in her heart and survived a major surgical procedure during which an attending physician donated a quart of his own blood for transfusion.

In 1944, with the Watch Tower Society under the administration of president Nathan Homer Knorr, The Watchtower asserted that the decrees contained in Genesis 9:4 and Leviticus 17:10–14 forbade the eating or drinking of blood in biblical times "whether by transfusion or by the mouth" and that this applied "in a spiritual way to the consecrated persons of good-will today, otherwise known as 'Jonadabs' of the Lord's 'other sheep'."

In September 1945, representatives of the Watch Tower Society in the Netherlands commented on blood transfusion in the Dutch edition of Consolation. A translation of their comments into English reads:

When we lose our life because we refuse inoculations, that does not bear witness as a justification of Jehovah's name. God never issued regulations which prohibit the use of drugs, inoculations or blood transfusions. It is an invention of people, who, like the Pharisees, leave Jehovah's mercy and love aside.

According to sociologist Richard Singelenbreg, the statement appearing in the Dutch edition of Consolation may have been published without knowledge of the doctrinal position published in the English July 1945 issue of Consolation by the Watch Tower Society's headquarters in the United States.

In 1945, the application of the doctrine on blood was expanded to prohibit blood transfusions of whole blood, whether allogeneic or autologous. The prohibition did not specify any punitive measures for accepting a transfusion, but by January 1961—in what was later described as an application of "increased strictness"—it was ruled that it was a disfellowshipping offense to conscientiously accept a blood transfusion. The Watch Tower Society warned that accepting a blood transfusion "may result in the immediate and very temporary prolongation of life, but that at the cost of eternal life for a dedicated Christian."

In September 1956, Awake! stated, "certain blood fractions ... also come under the Scriptural ban". A position against "the various blood fractions" was reiterated in September 1961. In November of the same year, the doctrine was modified to allow individual members to decide whether they could conscientiously accept fractions used from blood for purposes such as vaccination. This position has been expanded on since; the pre-formatted Durable Power of Attorney form provided by the Watch Tower Society includes an option for Jehovah's Witnesses to "accept all fractions derived from any primary component of blood."

In 1964, Jehovah's Witnesses were prohibited from obtaining transfusions for pets, from using fertilizer containing blood, and were even advised (if their conscience troubled them) to write to dog food manufacturers to verify that their products were blood-free. Later that year, it was stated that doctors or nurses who are Jehovah's Witnesses would not administer blood transfusions to fellow dedicated members. As to administering transfusions to non-members, The Watchtower stated that such a decision is "left to the Christian doctor's own conscience."

In 1982, an article in The Watchtower stated that it would be wrong for Witnesses to allow leeches to feed on their own blood as part of a medical procedure, due to the sacredness of blood.

In 1989, The Watchtower stated, "Each individual must decide" whether to accept hemodilution and autologous blood salvage (cell saver) procedures. In 1990, a brochure entitled How Can Blood Save Your Life? was released, outlining Jehovah's Witnesses' general doctrine on blood.

In 2000, the Watch Tower Society's stand on blood fractions was clearly stated. Members were instructed to personally decide if accepting a fraction would violate the doctrine on blood. In a later article, members were reminded that Jehovah's Witnesses do not donate blood or store their own blood prior to surgery.

In May 2001, the Watch Tower Society revised its medical directives and identity cards addressing its doctrinal position on blood; the revised materials were distributed from May 3, 2001. These revised documents specified that "allogeneic blood transfusions" were unacceptable whereas the former document (dated 1999) stated that "blood transfusions" were unacceptable. The revised 2001 documents were active until December 20, 2001. The Watch Tower Society then rescinded the revised document, stating, "After further review, it has been determined that the cards dated "md-E 6/01" and "ic-E 6/01" should not be used. Please destroy these items and make sure that they are not distributed to the publishers." Elders were instructed to revert to the older 1999 edition of the medical directives and identity cards.

On March 20, 2026, the blood transfusion policy was revised, allowing members to have their own blood drawn and stored for medical or surgical procedures that may require a transfusion. A further significant change was announced on September 18, 2026, permitting members to receive and donate the main blood components (red blood cells, white blood cells, platelets, and blood plasma), while retaining the prohibition on the transfusion of whole blood.

Watch Tower Society publications frequently claim negative consequences of blood transfusions:

- A 1951 issue of The Watchtower stated: "And let the transfusion enthusiasts with a savior-complex ponder the fact that on many occasions transfusions do harm, spread disease, and frequently cause deaths, which, of course, are not publicized."
- A 1961 article in The Watchtower quoted Brazilian surgeon Dr. Américo Valério as saying transfusions were often followed by "moral insanity, sexual perversions, repression, inferiority complexes, petty crimes" and Dr Alonzo Jay Shadman claiming that a person's blood "contains all the peculiarities of the individual ... [including] hereditary taints, disease susceptibilities, poisons due to personal living, eating and drinking habits ... The poisons that produce the impulse to commit suicide, murder, or steal are in the blood."
- In 1969, Awake! reported on a man named Robert Khoury, who, after receiving a blood transfusion said, "When I recovered I found I had a terrible desire to steal."
- In 1974, Awake! cited a Centers for Disease Control report that as many as 35,000 deaths and 500,000 illnesses a year might be due to the presence of serum hepatitis in blood for transfusions.
- A 2006 issue of Awake! highlighted dangers from transfusion-related acute lung injury (TRALI).

== Critical views ==
Opposition to the Watch Tower Society's doctrines about blood transfusions has come from current and former members, as well as non-members. One group of critics, the Alliance for Jehovah's Witness Research and Bioethics (AJWRB), states that there is no biblical basis for the prohibition of blood transfusions and promotes clinical and academic scrutiny of the doctrine. In a series of articles in the Journal of Medical Ethics, US neurologist Osamu Muramoto—a medical adviser to AJWRB, has raised issues regarding coercion to refuse transfusions, doctrinal inconsistency, selective use of information by the Watch Tower Society to exaggerate the dangers of transfusions, and the use of outdated medical beliefs.

=== Scriptural interpretation ===
Dissident Witnesses say the Society's use of Leviticus 17:12 to support its opposition to blood transfusions conflicts with its own teachings that Christians are not under the Mosaic law. Theologian Anthony Hoekema claims the blood prohibited in Levitical laws was not human, but animal. He cites other authors who support his view that the direction in Acts 15 to abstain from blood was intended not as an everlasting covenant but a means of maintaining a peaceful relationship between Jewish and Gentile Christians. He has described as "absurd literalism" the Witnesses' use of a scriptural prohibition on eating blood to prohibit the medical transfusion of human blood.

=== Coercion ===
Osamu Muramoto has argued that the refusal by Jehovah's Witnesses of "life-saving" blood treatment creates serious bio-medical ethical issues. He has criticized the "controlling intervention" of the Watch Tower Society by means of what he claims is information control and its policy of penalising members who accept blood transfusions or advocate freedom to choose blood-based treatment. He says the threat of being classified as a disassociated Witness and subsequently shunned by friends and relatives who are members coerces Jehovah's Witnesses to accept and obey the prohibition on blood transfusions. In one particular case involving a Russian district court decision, however, the European Court of Human Rights (ECHR) found nothing in the judgments to suggest that any form of improper pressure or undue influence was applied. It noted: "On the contrary, it appears that many Jehovah's Witnesses have made a deliberate choice to refuse blood transfusions in advance, free from time constraints of an emergency situation." The court said: "The freedom to accept or refuse specific medical treatment, or to select an alternative form of treatment, is vital to the principles of self-determination and personal autonomy. A competent adult patient is free to decide ... not to have a blood transfusion. However, for this freedom to be meaningful, patients must have the right to make choices that accord with their own views and values, regardless of how irrational, unwise or imprudent such choices may appear to others."

Muramoto has claimed the intervention of Hospital Liaison Committees can add to "organisational pressure" applied by family members, friends, and congregation members on Witness patients to refuse blood-based treatment. He notes that while HLC members, who are church elders, "may give the patient 'moral support', the influence of their presence on the patient is known to be tremendous. Case reports reveal JW patients have changed their earlier decision to accept blood treatment after a visit from the elders." He claims such organizational pressure compromises the autonomy of Witness patients and interferes with their privacy and confidentiality. He has advocated a policy in which the Watch Tower organization and congregation elders would not question patients on the details of their medical care and patients would not disclose such information. He says the Society adopted such a policy in 1983 regarding details of sexual activity between married couples.

Watch Tower spokesman Donald T. Ridley says neither elders nor HLC members are instructed or encouraged to probe into the health care decisions of Witness patients and do not involve themselves in patient hospitalisations unless patients request their assistance. Yet Watch Tower Society HLC representative David Malyon says he would respond to the "sin" of Witnesses he is privy to by effectively saying "Are you going to tell them or shall I!" Nevertheless Ridley says Muramoto's suggestion that Witnesses should be free to disregard Watch Tower scriptural teachings and standards is preposterous. He says loving God means obeying commandments, not disobeying them, and hiding one's disobedience from others.

Muramoto recommends doctors have a private meeting with patients to discuss their wishes, and that church elders and family members not be present, enabling patients to feel free of church pressure. He suggests doctors question patients on (a) whether they have considered that the Watch Tower Society might soon approve some medical practices they currently find objectionable, in the same manner that it has previously abandoned its opposition to vaccination and organ transplants; (b) whether Witness patients know which blood components are allowed and which are prohibited, and whether they acknowledge that those rulings are organizational policy rather than biblical teachings; and (c) whether they realize that although some Bible scriptures proscribe the eating of blood, eating and transfusing blood have entirely different effects on the body. HLC representative David Malyon has responded that Muramoto's suggested questions are an affront to coerce Jehovah's Witnesses with a "complicated philosophical inquisition" and, if used by doctors, would be "an abusive transformation of the medical role of succour and care into that of devil's advocate and trickster".

=== Selective use of information ===
Muramoto has claimed many Watch Tower Society publications employ exaggeration and emotionalism to emphasize the dangers of transfusions and the advantages of alternative treatments but present a distorted picture by failing to report any benefits of blood-based treatment. Nor do its publications acknowledge that in some situations, including rapid and massive haemorrhage, there are no alternatives to blood transfusions. He states that Watch Tower Society publications often discuss the risk of death as a result of refusing blood transfusions, but give little consideration to the prolonged suffering and disability that can result from refusal. Attorney and former Witness Kerry Louderback-Wood also claims that Witness publications exaggerate the medical risks of taking blood and the efficiency of non-blood medical therapies in critical situations.

Douglas E. Cowan, an academic in the sociology of religion, has claimed that members of the Christian countercult movement who criticize the Watch Tower Society make selective use of information themselves. For example, Christian apologist Richard Abanes wrote that their ban on blood transfusions "has led to countless Witness deaths over the years, including many children." Cowan wrote: "When the careful reader checks [Abanes' footnote], however, looking perhaps for some statistical substantiation, he or she finds only a statistical conjecture based on 1980 Red Cross blood use figures." Cowan also says Abanes omits "critical issues" in an attempt to "present the most negative face possible." Cowan wrote that "the reader is left with the impression that the Watchtower Society knowingly presides over a substantial number of preventable deaths each year."

=== Outdated medical beliefs ===
Osamu Muramoto says the Watch Tower Society relies on discarded, centuries-old medical beliefs to support its assertion that blood transfusions are the same as eating blood. The Watch Tower Society's 1990 brochure How Can Blood Save Your Life? quoted 17th-century anatomist Thomas Bartholin to support its view. Muramoto says the view that blood is nourishment—still espoused in Watch Tower publications—was abandoned by modern medicine many decades ago. He has criticized an analogy commonly used by the Society in which it states: "Consider a man who is told by the doctor that he must abstain from alcohol. Would he be obedient if he quit drinking alcohol but had it put directly into his veins?" Muramoto says the analogy is false, explaining: "Orally ingested alcohol is absorbed as alcohol and circulated as such in the blood, whereas orally eaten blood is digested and does not enter the circulation as blood. Blood introduced directly into the veins circulates and functions as blood, not as nutrition. Hence, blood transfusion is a form of cellular organ transplantation. And ... organ transplants are now permitted by the WTS." He says the objection to blood transfusions on the basis of biblical proscriptions against eating blood is similar to the refusal of a heart transplant on the basis that a doctor warned a patient to abstain from eating meat because of his high cholesterol level.

David Malyon, chairman of the English Hospital Liaison Committee in Luton, England, has claimed that Muramoto's discussion of the differences between consuming blood and alcohol is pedantic and says blood laws in the Bible are based upon the reverence for life and its association with blood, and that laws should be kept in the spirit as much as in the letter.

=== Inconsistency ===
Muramoto has described as peculiar and inconsistent the Watch Tower policy of acceptance of all the individual components of blood plasma as long as they are not taken at the same time. He says the Society offers no biblical explanation for differentiating between prohibited treatments and those considered a "matter of conscience", explaining the distinction is based entirely on arbitrary decisions of the Governing Body, to which Witnesses must adhere strictly on the premise of them being Bible-based truth. He has questioned why white blood cells (1 per cent of blood volume) and platelets (0.17 per cent) are forbidden, yet albumin (2.2 per cent of blood volume) is permitted. He has questioned why donating blood and storing blood for autologous transfusion is deemed wrong, but the Watch Tower Society permits the use of blood components that must be donated and stored before Witnesses use them. He has questioned why Witnesses, although viewing blood as sacred and symbolizing life, are prepared to let a person die by placing more importance on the symbol than the reality it symbolizes.

Kerry Louderback-Wood says that by labeling the currently acceptable blood fractions as "minute" in relation to whole blood, the Watch Tower Society causes followers to misunderstand the scope and extent of allowed fractions.

The Watch Tower Society's response is that the real issue is not of the fluid per se, but of respect and obedience to God. They say their principle of abstaining from blood as a display of respect is demonstrated by the fact that members are allowed to eat meat that still contains some blood. As soon as blood is drained from an animal, the respect has been shown to God, and then a person can eat the meat even though it may contain a small amount of blood. Jehovah's Witnesses' view of meat and blood is different from that of kosher Jewish adherents, who go to great lengths to remove minor traces of blood.

== See also ==
- Knocking, a documentary on Witnesses that features bloodless medicine.
- The Children Act, a 2014 novel by Ian McEwan in which the issue is central to the plot
- The Children Act, a 2017 film adaptation of the novel
- Bethany Hughes
