= Ron Lapin =

American physician

Ronald Lapin
- Born: 1941
- Died: May 16, 1995 (aged 53–54)
- Occupation: surgeon

Ronald Lapin (1941–May 16, 1995) was an Israeli-born American surgeon. He is known as a "bloodless surgeon" due to his willingness to perform surgeries on severely anemic Jehovah's Witness patients without the use of blood transfusions, which are forbidden by the religion. He completed medical school in New York City and established his practice in Orange County, CA, in the 1970s, where he lived until his death.

He promoted the use of electric scalpels in bloodless surgeries to reduce blood loss.

Lapin became interested in bloodless surgery in the mid-1970s, while practicing his profession in Orange County, CA. He was approached by a severely anemic Jehovah's Witness in need of surgery. During this first operation on a Witness patient, Lapin secured the help of the anesthesiologist by assuring him that the blood needed for the operation was "on its way". After successfully performing that first surgery without the use of any transfused blood, Witnesses who heard of his cooperation came to him for help with their surgical needs.

He founded several bloodless surgery centers in Southern California, including hospitals in Norwalk, Bellflower, and Fountain Valley, and became an advocate of non-blood medical management.

In 1980, Lapin was chosen by a Japanese pharmaceutical firm to operate on Jehovah's Witness patients, with conditional FDA approval, using Fluosol DA, as an artificial blood substitute. The oxygen-carrying properties of the product were the subject of a segment on the ABC television program "That's Incredible!". During the show, one of Lapin's patients, Donna Graham of Winchester, CA, was shown recovering from an emergency hysterectomy, having received approval for a transfusion of the artificial blood due to extreme loss of blood prior to admission.

Lapin was the target of legal challenges over his practices. His story is recounted in the Gene Church biography No Man's Blood.

Lapin's divorce was reported on in Orange County and Los Angeles newspapers, and rape allegations were made against him. He was later exonerated of the rape allegations.
