= Smith v Gardner Merchant =

- Court: Court of Appeal of England and Wales
- Decided: 14 July 1998
- Citation: [1998] IRLR 510, [1999] ICR 134, [1998] 3 All ER 852, [1998] EWCA Civ 1207

Court membership
- Judges sitting: Beldam LJ, Ward LJ and Sir Christopher Slade

Smith v Gardner Merchant [1998] IRLR 510 is a UK labour law case, concerning the possibility of claiming compensation for discrimination under the gender statutes. It took place before the Employment Equality (Sexual Orientation) Regulations 2003 were introduced.

== Facts ==
Paul Smith worked as a barman for the Coliseum and then the Globe Theatre. Gardner Merchant were contracted to provide catering at a large number of London theatres and employed 52,000 in the UK. At the latter theatre, a homophobic (not proven) colleague called Barbara Touhy harassed him, saying he had diseases and should be put on an island. She hit him in the back one night (not proven). He complained, and the employer took her version that he was being aggressive towards her and found he had started a fight in front of theatre goers. Smith's colleagues, many of whom were gay told the Company that Smith flaunted his sexuality and said he was unpopular. He was dismissed for gross misconduct after a lengthy investigation and an appeal to a Director. He alleged discrimination under the Sex Discrimination Act 1975, saying that a comparator ought to be a homosexual woman, and that he was therefore less favourably treated on grounds of his sex. This issue had never been raised with the Company at his dismissal hearings. He sought financial support from a Gay Rights group who wanted to challenge that the Sex Discrimination Act did not cover Sexual Orientation. They firstly asked for £20,000 to settle. (Smith had less than 24 months service so the only route to a Tribunal was to allege discrimination as that had no minimum service requirement). John Stacey, (https://contactout.com/John-Stacey-9924843) who at the time was Group Human Resources Director, took the view that because of the number of gay employees particularly in the theatres, The Company could not settle as it would be seen as an admission that it had discriminated on sexuality and declined to settle. The merits of the case were not heard as both the Tribunal and the EAT found against him on points of application of discrimination law because they held it was sexuality discrimination, not gender discrimination that he suffered. Smith appealed and the case was heading to the European Court of Justice but had to seek leave from the Court of Appeal. Stacey prepared the Company for such a fight and the legal costs had already exceeded the settlement offer. Just before the Court of Appeal hearing, the Grant v South West Trains case was dismissed by the ECJ so the Court of Appeal, using that clear judgement, referred the Smith case back to an Employment Tribunal to be heard on its merits. On the day of the Tribunal hearing, neither Smith nor his representatives appeared and the case was dismissed.

== Judgment ==
Ward LJ held that the tribunals had failed to ask themselves whether a homosexual woman would not have been less favourably treated. That was the correct question, which they would have to try to do again. The suggestion was, that Barbara would not have been malicious and violent towards a gay woman, and therefore there probably was discrimination.

== See also ==
- UK employment discrimination law
- UK labour law
- Human Rights Act 1998
