= Conipyridoin E =

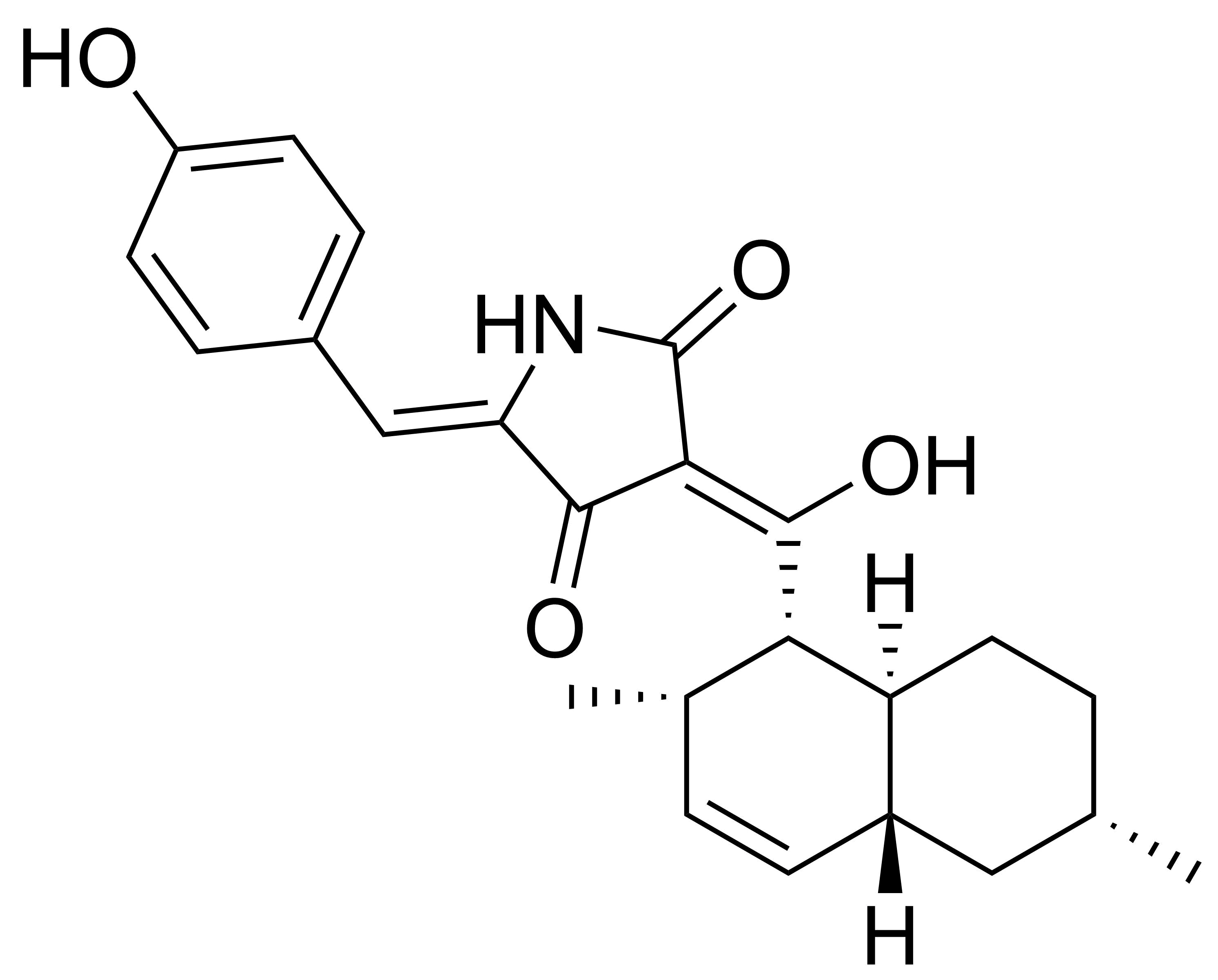

Names
- IUPAC name 3-[(1S,2S,4aR,6S,8aS')-2,6-Dimethyl-1,2,4a,5,6,7,8,8a-octahydronaphthalene-1-carbonyl]-4-hydroxy-5-[(4-hydroxyphenyl)methylidene]pyrrol-2-one

Identifiers
3D model (JSmol)	Interactive image
ChEBI	CHEBI:218914
ChemSpider	78439471
PubChem CID	139591410
- InChI: InChI=1S/C24H27NO4/c1-13-3-10-18-16(11-13)7-4-14(2)20(18)23(28)21-22(27)19(25-24(21)29)12-15-5-8-17(26)9-6-15/h4-9,12-14,16,18,20,26-27H,3,10-11H2,1-2H3,(H,25,29)/t13-,14-,16-,18-,20-/m0/s1; Key: ZTPRGNSDYJYDLV-GDQDSAMQSA-N
- SMILES: CC1CCC2C(C1)C=CC(C2C(=O)C3=C(C(=CC4=CC=C(C=C4)O)NC3=O)O)C

Properties
Chemical formula	C_{24}H_{27}NO_{4}
Molar mass	393.483 g·mol^{−1}
- Except where otherwise noted, data are given for materials in their standard state (at 25 °C [77 °F], 100 kPa). Infobox references

Conipyridoin E is a tetramic acid derivative produced by the fungus Coniochaeta cephalothecoides which was found on a Tibetan Plateau. This natural product has been shown to exhibit antibacterial and antifungal activity against a variety of bacteria, such as Staphylococcus aureus, methicillin-resistant Staphyloccusaureus, and Enterococcus faecalis with MIC_{50} values of around 0.97 μM. Isolation of a number of analogs of conipyridoin has been accomplished by Han et al. in order to discover novel antibiotic natural products to combat antibiotic resistance.

== Biosynthesis ==
The biosynthesis of conipyridoin E has been proposed as a hybrid between Type I polyketide synthase (PKS) and an amino acid biogenetic pathway. The decalin moiety is attributed to PKS using acetyl-CoA, malonyl-CoA, methylmalonyl-CoA and the many modular enzymes that can change the corresponding functional groups along the carbon chain. There are only six unique modules along with one loading module for the Type I polyketide synthases.

Once this precursor to conipyridoin E is biosynthesized, an intramolecular Diels-Alder (IMDA) reaction takes place to give a stereospecific decalin moiety. Next, L-tyrosine is introduced to form the tetramic acid derivative after cyclization with the 1,3-diketone takes place. This tetramic acid moiety, along with the decalin structure, are key pharmacophores for antibiotic activity, as seen in a number of other decalin-containing antibiotics. The final steps in the biosynthesis include regiospecific hydration and elimination to afford a Z-olefin and another regiospecific reduction of an alkene within the decalin structure. These final modifications to the decalin and tetramate structures yield Conipyridoin E. A number of derivatives can easily be synthesized by these fungi by either including further post-tailoring synthase steps to the PKS process or by altering these final modifications to the decalin and tetramic acid structures.

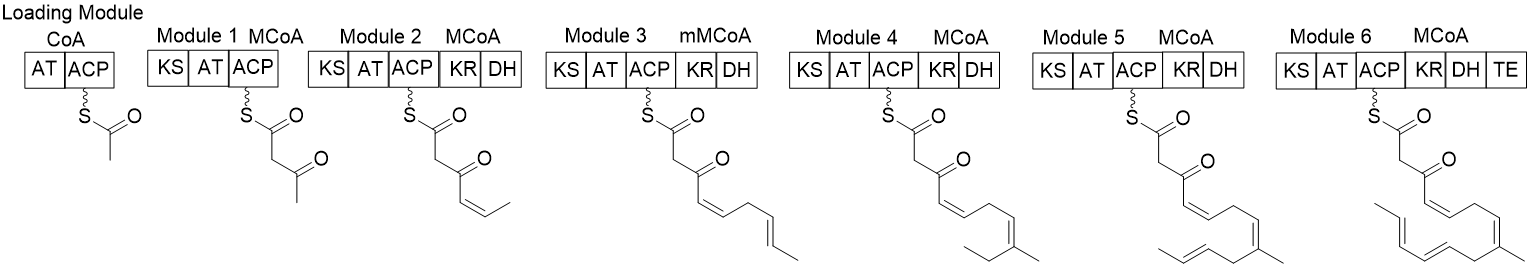
Modular biosynthesis of conipyridoin E: CoA= acetyl CoA, MCoA= malonyl CoA, mMCoA= methyl malonyl CoA, AT= acyl transferase, ACP= acyl carrier protein, KS= ketosynthase, KR=ketoreductase, DH= dehydratase, TE=thioesterase

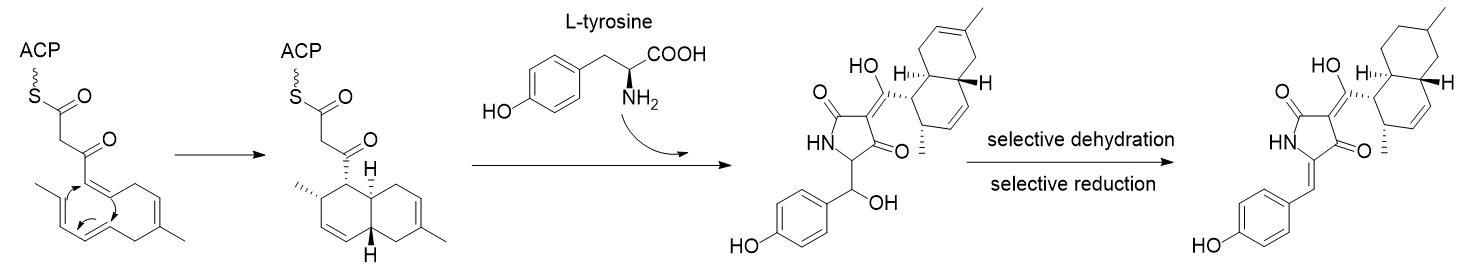
Amino acid biosynthesis of conipyridoin E
