= Artificial Cells, Nanomedicine, and Biotechnology =

- Discipline: Biochemistry, biotechnology
- Language: English
- Edited by: Thomas M.S. Chang

Publication details
- Former name(s): Artificial Cells, Blood Substitutes, and Biotechnology; Biomaterials, Artificial Cells and Immobilization Biotechnology; Biomaterials, Artificial Cells and Artificial Organs; Biomaterials, Medical Devices, and Artificial Organs
- History: 1973–present
- Publisher: Taylor & Francis
- Frequency: 8/year
- Impact factor: 6.355 (2021)

Standard abbreviations
- ISO 4: Artif. Cells Nanomed. Biotechnol.

Indexing
- ISSN: 2169-1401 (print); 2169-141X (web)

Links
- Journal homepage

Artificial Cells, Nanomedicine, and Biotechnology is a peer-reviewed scientific journal that publishes articles on the development of artificial cells, tissue engineering, artificial organs, blood substitutes, cell therapy, gene and drug delivery systems, bioencapsulation nanosensors, nanodevices, and other areas of biotechnology. It is published by Taylor & Francis and the editors-in-chief are R.D.K. Misra (University of Texas at El Paso) and Wojciech Chrzanowski (University of Sydney).
