= Alliance for Human Research Protection =

Non-profit organization

- Type: Non-profit
- Website: ahrp.org

The Alliance for Human Research Protection (AHRP) is a non-profit and tax-exempt organization with a group of professional people who aim: to develop practices of ethical medical research to minimize the risks related to those practices and to ensure the protection of human rights, welfare, and dignity It was founded by Vera Sharav.

== Contribution ==
The AHRP raises public awareness about the issue through educational campaigns; informing research subjects about their rights; alerting the media; politicians; and concerning groups about the situation.
