= Perfluorodecalin =

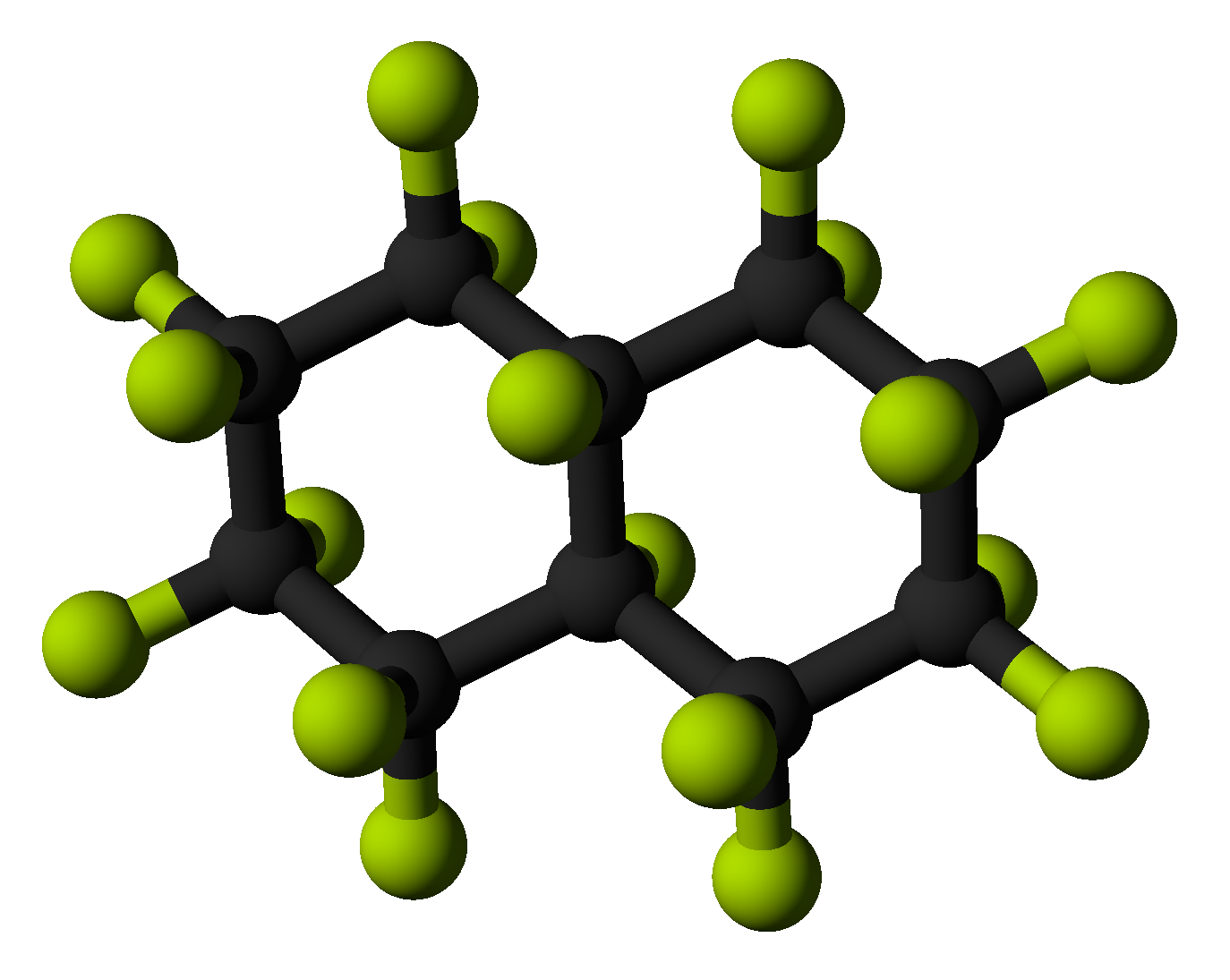

Names
- Preferred IUPAC name Octadecafluorodecahydronaphthalene
- Other names Flutec PP6; F-decalin; Perflunafene

Identifiers
CAS Number	306-94-5
3D model (JSmol)	trans-isomer: Interactive image; cis-isomer: Interactive image
Abbreviations	PFD
ChEBI	CHEBI:38848
ChemSpider	13888074
ECHA InfoCard	100.005.631
EC Number	206-192-4
KEGG	D08338
PubChem CID	9386
UNII	54A06VV62N
CompTox Dashboard (EPA)	DTXSID0046511
- InChI: InChI=1S/C10F18/c11-1-2(12,5(17,18)9(25,26)7(21,22)3(1,13)14)6(19,20)10(27,28)8(23,24)4(1,15)16 Key: UWEYRJFJVCLAGH-UHFFFAOYSA-N
- SMILES: trans-isomer: FC1(F)C(F)(F)C(F)(F)[C@]2(F)C(F)(F)C(F)(F)C(F)(F)C(F)(F)[C@@]2(F)C1(F)F; cis-isomer: FC1(F)C(F)(F)C(F)(F)[C@]2(F)C(F)(F)C(F)(F)C(F)(F)C(F)(F)[C@]2(F)C1(F)F

Properties
Chemical formula	C_{10}F_{18}
Molar mass	462
Appearance	Clear, colorless liquid
Density	1.917
Boiling point	142 °C (288 °F; 415 K)
Solubility in water	10 ppm

Hazards
- Occupational safety and health (OHS/OSH)
Main hazards	None
Flash point	None
Autoignition temperature	None
- Except where otherwise noted, data are given for materials in their standard state (at 25 °C [77 °F], 100 kPa). verify (what is ?) Infobox references

Perfluorodecalin (C_{10}F_{18}) is a fluorocarbon, a derivative of decalin in which all of the hydrogen atoms are replaced by fluorine atoms. It is chemically and biologically inert and stable up to 400 °C. Several applications make use of its ability to dissolve gases.

== Manufacture ==
It is manufactured by the fluorination of tetralin or decalin with cobalt(III) fluoride in the Fowler process. For most applications, several steps of purification are required after reaction.

== Isomers ==
Perfluorodecalin exhibits cis-trans isomerism, as the tertiary fluorines atoms on the bridge carbon atoms can be either on the same side as each other (cis-isomer) or on opposite sides (trans-isomer). Both isomers are chemically and biologically inert and are very similar in their physical properties. The most notable difference is in the melting point, which is −3.6 °C for the cis-isomer, +18 °C for the trans-isomer, and −6.7 °C for a 50/50 mixture.

cis

trans

== Medical applications ==
Of all the perfluorocarbons, perfluorodecalin has probably seen the most interest in medical applications. Most applications utilize its ability to dissolve large amounts of oxygen (100 mL of perfluorodecalin at 25 °C can dissolve 49 mL of oxygen at STP).

Perfluorodecalin was an ingredient in Fluosol, an artificial blood product developed by Green Cross Corporation in the 1980s. It is also being studied for use in liquid breathing, and alternative methods for emergency treatment of respiratory failure. Perfluorodecalin can be applied topically, to provide extra oxygen to a specific location, to accelerate wound healing. Organs and tissues can be stored for longer in oxygenated perfluorodecalin; the "two-layer method" uses perfluorodecalin and UW solution to preserve tissue for pancreas transplants.

It is an ingredient of Perftoran, a blood substitute that also contains perfluoro-N-(4-methylcyclohexyl)-piperidine along with a surfactant, proxanol-268. It was developed in Russia and as of 2005 was marketed there.

== Other applications ==
Due to its gas-carrying capacity, perfluorodecalin has been used to enhance oxygen delivery during cell culture. Perfluorodecalin has also been shown to dramatically enhance in vivo microscopy resolution of airspace-containing tissues such as mesophyll. Mounting leaves in perfluorodecalin significantly improves the optical qualities of the leaf, thereby enabling high-resolution imaging over twofold deeper into the mesophyll, compared with using water. The physiological impact of mounting the specimen in perfluorodecalin is also minimal compared to water.

Perfluorodecalin is partially miscible with hydrocarbons which makes it an attractive inert anti-solvent for some specialized applications, such as self-organization of perovskite nanocrystals into supercrystals (also known as superlattices).

This compound is sometimes used to dissolve Teflon AF (not to be confused with other Teflons, as PTFE, PFA and FEP).
