= Werth v. Taylor =

1991 Michigan Court of Appeals case

- Court: Michigan Court of Appeals
- Argued: January 16, 1991
- Decided: July 8, 1991
- Docket nos.: 123785
- Citations: 190 Mich. App. 141 (1991); 475 N.W.2d 426 (Mich. Ct. App. 1991)

Court membership
- Judges sitting: Janet T. Neff; Douglas P. Shepherd; Gary R. McDonald

Case opinions
- Majority: Neff, joined by unanimous

Werth v. Taylor, 190 Mich. App. 141 (1991), is a case heard by the Michigan Court of Appeals in which the court refused to hold a doctor liable for giving a Jehovah's Witness a life-saving blood transfusion. As a Jehovah's Witness, plaintiff Cindy Werth believed that receiving a blood transfusion would be a sin. After she gave birth, however, she experienced postpartum bleeding. Werth agreed to surgery; she said she did not want blood transfusions, but did not firmly commit to refusing one should it become a life-or-death situation. During the surgery, her condition worsened rapidly; the anesthesiologist, defendant Michael Taylor, gave her a blood transfusion, deeming it necessary to save her life. Werth sued for medical malpractice and battery.

Many states, including Michigan, have held that there is a right to refuse even lifesaving treatment; to intrude on this right is medical battery. However, some states set a high bar on what constitutes a valid refusal for lifesaving treatment; the Supreme Court of Pennsylvania held that a "fully conscious contemporaneous decision by the patient" is required.

The Michigan Court of Appeals ruled for Taylor; the court found that a refusal of lifesaving treatment had to be contemporaneous and informed, similar to Pennsylvania's standard. Because Werth had not refused treatment under the impression that it could be fatal, the court found, it could not be considered contemporaneous or informed. Legal scholars criticized the decision, arguing that the court had made it too difficult for a person to refuse lifesaving treatment in advance of being unconscious.

== Background ==
=== Facts ===
In 1985, Cindy Werth became pregnant with twins. She and her husband, Donald, were Jehovah's Witnesses; like other Jehovah's Witnesses, they strongly believed that it would be a sin to receive a blood transfusion. Two months before birth, Cindy signed a form with Alpena General Hospital in Michigan refusing to allow any blood transfusions. Donald signed the same refusal when she was admitted to the hospital in 1988 to deliver the baby.

Cindy gave birth to the twins in May 1986, but then started to experience postpartum bleeding; hospital doctor Cheryl Parsons examined her and recommended a dilation and curettage. As Cindy later recalled, Parsons was aware that Cindy had refused blood transfusions, and asked whether she would stick to that refusal if her life were at stake. Cindy said the question made her afraid, as she had not thought that her life was in any danger. She said that Donald said that she should not receive blood, but she should also not die; he requested that the doctors use an alternative treatment he had heard was available to other Jehovah's Witnesses. Donald's testimony matched with this account. Parsons recalled asking whether they would consent to a transfusion; Cindy said no, but Donald was more equivocal. Cindy and Donald asked Parsons whether she thought this would really be necessary, to which she replied "not right now".

Cindy was put under anesthesia and Parsons began performing the surgery, with anesthesiologist Michael Taylor assisting. The surgery was not enough; Cindy's blood pressure began to fall "rapidly and significantly", along with other symptoms appearing in her eyes, heart, and skin. Taylor determined that Cindy needed a blood transfusion to live. Parsons told Taylor about the Werths' beliefs; Taylor replied, "that may be, but she needs the blood". Taylor performed a blood transfusion on Cindy. She sued Taylor, the hospital, and Alpena County for medical malpractice, and additionally sued Taylor for battery.

=== Law ===
Many states have recognized that when a doctor performs a procedure on a person without their consent, they are committing the tort of battery. In emergency situations, however, there is not always time to obtain consent before performing a lifesaving procedure – but this also does not mean that patients cannot refuse lifesaving procedures. As an Ohio appeals court stated, without that caveat to the emergency exception, "a physician could circumvent the express wishes of a terminal patient by waiting to act until the patient was comatose and critical". The Supreme Court of Pennsylvania considered In re Estate of Dorone, a case very similar to Werth except that the patient only had a blood transfusion refusal card from the Watchtower Society. There, the court ruled that the patient's refusal was invalid because "where there is an emergency calling for an immediate decision, nothing less than a fully conscious contemporaneous decision by the patient will be sufficient to override evidence of medical necessity". Some scholars criticized the holding of Dorone for seemingly not allowing a patient to refuse lifesaving treatment with an advance healthcare directive.

== Legal proceedings ==
Werth's lawsuit was filed in the Michigan Circuit Court in Alpena County, before Circuit Judge Joseph Swallow. Swallow granted summary judgment to Taylor in November 1989, holding that the blood transfusion was lifesaving treatment and that consent for the treatment was implied because they had never specified that their refusal applied to lifesaving treatment. Werth appealed to the Michigan Court of Appeals.

Writing for a unanimous three-judge panel of the Michigan Court of Appeals, Judge Janet T. Neff affirmed the district court's grant of summary judgment, deciding the case for Taylor in July 1991. The court acknowledged that adults have the right to refuse treatment, including lifesaving treatment. However, the court found that when confronted, Cindy did not commit to refusing treatment in a life-or-death situation. The court favorably cited Dorone to that end, finding that for a rejection of lifesaving treatment to be valid, it has to be "fully conscious", "contemporaneous", "informed", and given by the patient themself. Werth was unconscious at the time, and the court found that her previous objections to blood transfusions were not contemporaneous or informed because at the time they were given, there was no expectation that it would be a life-or-death choice. Because Donald was not the patient, the court held that he could not refuse lifesaving treatment on her behalf.

== Reaction ==
Multiple legal scholars criticized the court's holding that a refusal of lifesaving treatment is only valid when it is informed and contemporaneous. Holly Fernandez Lynch, Michele Mathes, and Nadia N. Sawicki, wrote in the Journal of Legal Medicine that under the holding in Werth, a doctor that wants to administer a treatment the patient has refused could just wait until it became an emergency. The holding of Werth, they wrote, should be "strenuously rejected". Michael Strasser agreed, writing in the San Diego Law Review that the holding could "seriously undermine the patient's right to bodily autonomy in the medical treatment context". He also argued that Parsons, the doctor, had effectively invalidated Werth's refusal just by telling her that there was no chance of significant harm from the operation. Randy Henderson and Nicholas Jabbour questioned in a book they wrote whether an unconscious person, or any other person who cannot communicate, could ever meet the standards of Werth. A paper written by a J.D. and an M.D. in Academic Emergency Medicine criticized Werth on the same grounds as Dorone, arguing that it does not allow for any kind of advance refusal of lifesaving treatment. However, it otherwise approved of the very high standard of proof the court demanded before agreeing to make a decision that would end someone's life.
