= Bloodless surgery =

Surgery without transfusion of allogeneic blood

Bloodless surgery is a non-invasive surgical method developed by orthopedic surgeon Adolf Lorenz, who was known as "the bloodless surgeon of Vienna". His medical practice was a consequence of his severe allergy to carbolic acid routinely used in operating rooms of the era. His condition forced him to become a "dry surgeon". Contemporary usage of the term refers to both invasive and noninvasive medical techniques and protocols. The expression does not mean surgery that makes no use of blood or blood transfusion. Rather, it refers to surgery performed without transfusion of allogeneic blood. Champions of bloodless surgery do, however, transfuse products made from allogeneic blood (blood from other people) and they also make use of pre-donated blood for autologous transfusion (blood pre-donated by the patient). Interest in bloodless surgery has arisen for several reasons. Jehovah's Witnesses reject blood transfusions on religious grounds; others may be concerned about bloodborne diseases, such as hepatitis and AIDS.

== History ==
During the early 1960s, American heart surgeon Denton Cooley successfully performed numerous bloodless open-heart surgeries on Jehovah's Witness patients. Fifteen years later, he and his associate published a report of more than 500 cardiac surgeries in this population, documenting that cardiac surgery could be safely performed without blood transfusion.

Ron Lapin (1941–1995) was an American surgeon, who became interested in bloodless surgery in the mid-1970s. He was known as a "bloodless surgeon" due to his willingness to perform surgeries on severely anemic Jehovah's Witness patients without the use of blood transfusions.

Patricia A. Ford (born 1955) was the first surgeon to perform a bloodless bone marrow transplant.

In 1988, Professor James Isbister, a haematologist from Australia, first proposed a paradigm shift back to a patient focus. In 2005, he penned an article in the journal, 'Updates in Blood Conservation and Transfusion alternatives'. In this article Prof. Isbister coined the term 'patient blood management', noting that the focus should be changed from the product to the patient.

== Principles ==
Several principles of bloodless surgery have been published.

Preoperative techniques such as erythropoietin (EPO) or iron administration are designed to stimulate the patient's own erythropoiesis.

In surgery, control of bleeding is achieved with the use of laser or sonic scalpels, minimally invasive surgical techniques, electrosurgery and electrocautery, low central venous pressure anesthesia (for select cases), or suture ligation of vessels. Other methods include the use of blood substitutes, which at present do not carry oxygen but expand the volume of the blood to prevent shock. Many doctors view acute normovolemic hemodilution, a form of storage of a patient's own blood, as a pillar of "bloodless surgery" but the technique is not an option for patients who refuse autologous blood transfusions.

Intraoperative blood salvage is a technique which recycles and cleans blood from a patient during an operation and redirects it into the patient's body.

Postoperatively, surgeons seek to minimize further blood loss by continuing administration of medications to augment blood cell mass and minimizing the number of blood draws and the quantity of blood drawn for testing, for example, by using pediatric blood tubes for adult patients. Hemoglobin-Based Oxygen Carriers such as Polyheme and Hemepure have been discontinued due to severe adverse reactions including death. South Africa was the only country where they were legally authorized as standard treatment but they are no longer available.

== Benefits ==
Bloodless medicine appeals to many doctors because it carries low risk of post-operative infection when compared with procedures requiring blood transfusion. Additionally, it may be economically beneficial in some countries. For example, the cost of blood in the US hovers around $500 a unit, including testing. These costs are further increased as, according to Jan Hoffman (an administrator for the blood conservation program at Geisinger Medical Center in Danville, Pennsylvania), hospitals must cover the cost of the first three units of blood infused per patient per calendar year. By contrast, hospitals may be reimbursed for drugs that boost a patient's red blood cell count, a treatment approach often used before and after surgery to reduce the need for a blood transfusion. However, such payments are highly contingent upon negotiations with insurance companies. Geisinger Medical Center began a blood conservation program in 2005 and reported a recorded savings of $273,000 in its first six months of operation. The Cleveland Clinic lowered their direct costs from US$35.5 million in 2009 to $26.4 million in 2012—a savings of nearly $10 million over 3 years.

Health risks appear to be another contributing factor in their appeal, especially in light of recent studies that suggest that blood transfusions can increase the risk of complications and reduce survival rates. Thus, patients who do not receive blood products during hospitalization often recover more quickly, experience fewer complications, and are able to be discharged home more quickly.

== See also ==
- Knocking, a documentary on Jehovah's Witnesses that features a bloodless liver transplant

== Sources ==
- No man's blood by Gene Church (1983) ISBN 0-86666-155-7
- First Do No Harm Documentary
- Cleveland Clinic - Wall Street Journal
