= PolyHeme =

Former proposed blood substitute

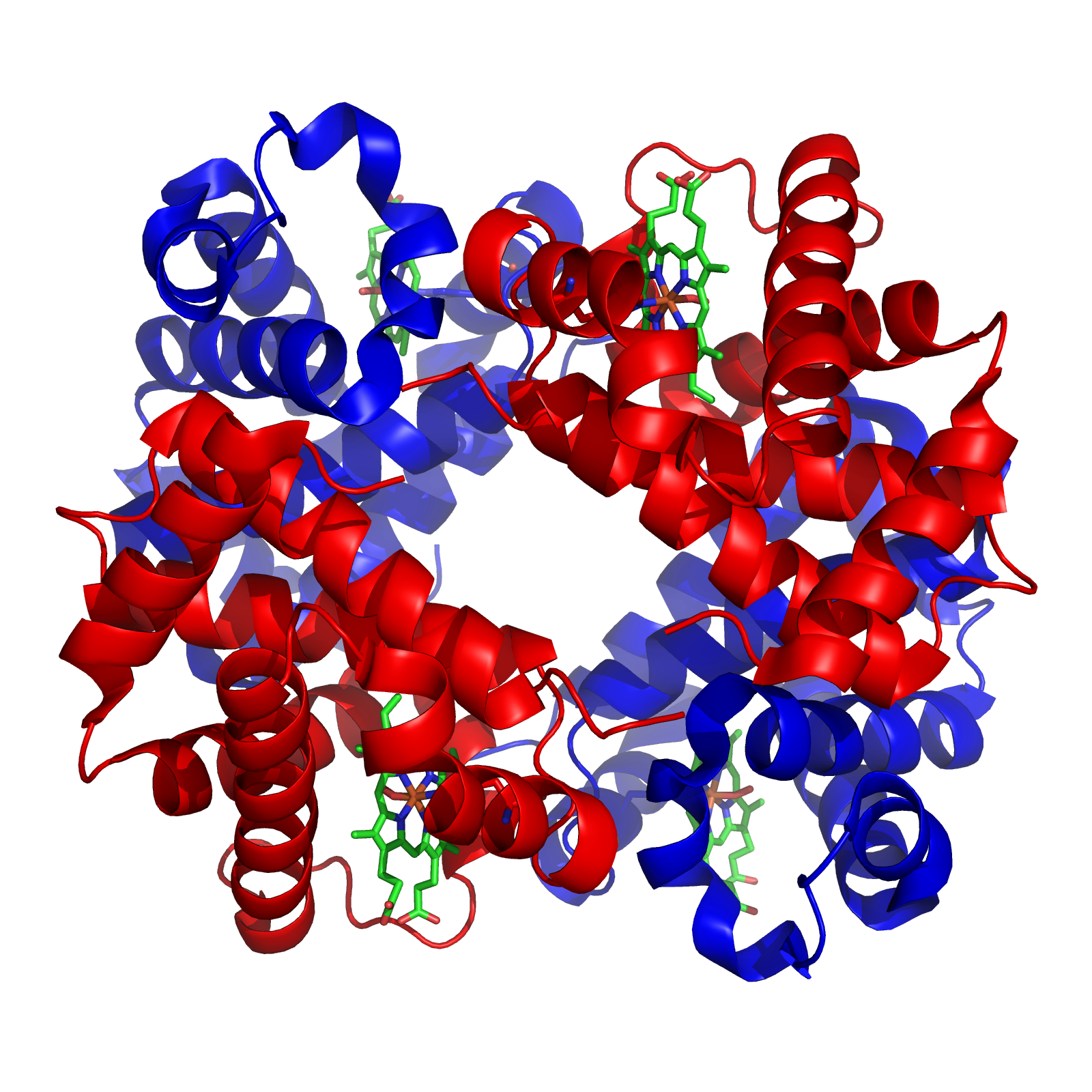
A molecule of human hemoglobin.

PolyHeme was a proposed temporary oxygen-carrying blood substitute made from human hemoglobin for emergency treatment of trauma situations where large volumes of blood are lost, with emphasis on situations where fresh blood for transfusion is not readily available. It originally began as a military project following the Vietnam War and was being developed by Northfield Laboratories, Inc. until clinical trial data showed Polyheme patients suffered increased morbidity, suspected as being due to vasoconstrictive side effects. Operations were shut down in 2009.

== Production ==
PolyHeme was a solution of human hemoglobin extracted from red blood cells that was modified using a multi-step polymerization process. The purified hemoglobin was associated into tetramers and incorporated into an electrolyte solution in an attempt to reduce the side-effects of using non-polymerized hemoglobin such as vasoconstriction and renal failure. The company used expired human blood from which the hemoglobin was extracted and purified. The hemoglobin molecule was then pyridoxylated to raise its P50. Subsequently, this hemoglobin was polymerized with glutaraldehyde.

== Advantages ==
Because PolyHeme was a hemoglobin solution and did not contain intact red blood cells which express ABO antigens, cross-matching of the product or typing of the patient was not necessary. This is required with units of red blood cells. It had a shelf life of over twelve months and could be stored at room temperature, versus red blood cell units which require refrigeration. The storage conditions and lack of need for compatibility testing would have made PolyHeme advantageous in emergency situations as well as in treating combat casualties. Another advantage was its acceptance by some patients seeking bloodless medical care. Of note, not all patients who object to blood transfusions would have accepted PolyHeme as the hemoglobin is derived from human blood. PolyHeme only provided oxygen carrying capacity and did not provide coagulation/clotting factors or platelets.

== Disadvantages ==
PolyHeme had several disadvantages which it shared with early generations of haemoglobin solutions. Firstly it has an intravascular dwell time significantly shorter than 120 days dwell time of transfused red blood cells. The result is that the effects of infusion are temporary and it may be necessary to transfuse red blood cells after PolyHeme is excreted. Secondly it interferes with many laboratory tests, especially those measured spectrophotometrically. Finally, it has been associated with an increased risk of myocardial infarction (heart attack) in patients receiving it during the Phase III trial.

== Clinical trials and consent controversy ==
Polyheme finished a Phase III trauma trial in June 2006.

The testing was completed at more than 25 Level I trauma centers in the United States under a Food and Drug Administration special category (21CFR 50.24) in 1996 that allows its use without patient consent in special circumstances. PolyHeme was the 15th such experiment allowed by the FDA. Although Northfield Laboratories came under scrutiny for this trial, enrollment of the 720 patient trial was completed on July 31, 2006. "Between 2003 and 2006, 720 trauma victims at thirty-two U.S. medical centers were "enrolled" in a research study to determine the efficacy of Polyheme, a patented blood substitute manufactured by Northfield Laboratories".

The controversy arose from the fact that the participants in this study were incapable of giving their consent due to the nature of their injuries. The only way to opt out from the study was by wearing a special bracelet prior to needing emergency care (the bracelet can be requested by calling 717-531-5829). This practice is sanctioned by the FDA as necessary emergency research, but patients' rights groups protested the study.

Lists of the participating hospitals can be found at Artificial Blood Experiment: Is Your City Participating? and ClinicalTrials.gov.

== Petition for fast track ==
In a financial analysts and investors meeting on August 8, 2006, in New York City, Northfield Labs revealed that it had just sent in an application to the FDA for Fast Track designation of PolyHeme and that by law, the FDA was supposed to provide a response within two months. If a Fast Track designation is approved, Northfield planned to request for Priority Review when it submit its biologic license application (BLA) sometime in the first half of the year 2007. Fast Track is a feature of the FDA Modernization Act of 1997 and is intended to facilitate the development and expedite the review of products intended for the treatment of serious or life-threatening conditions and which demonstrate the potential to address an unmet medical need for such a condition. It was also re-stated that the company expected to report top-line results of PolyHeme's Phase III study in the fall of 2006.

In a press release on October 10, 2006, it was released that Northfield Labs and the FDA had both agreed to defer the Fast Track designation until the availability of the top-line result in the fall. Fast Track designation was deferred because the FDA needs to know not just the product, but also the indication for which the product will be used. The indication was yet to be determined because the PolyHeme Phase III trial had two primary endpoints of superiority and non-inferiority. And until the release of the top-line result, whether either, both or none of the endpoints were met is unknown.

The Phase III trial was designed as an "active-control dual superiority-noninferiority trial comparing the survival of PolyHeme patients to those who received standard treatment (salt water plus blood)". On December 19, 2006, Northfield Labs released preliminary results of the trial, and the mortality data was disappointing: 13.2 percent of patients receiving PolyHeme died versus 9.6 percent among the control group. This news led to Northfield shares plummeting more than 50%. However, the company remains optimistic, noting that of the 712 randomized treatment patients, 20% of the PolyHeme group and 15% of the control group were protocol violations, leaving a valid total of 586 patients. Northfield is currently re-evaluating the study database to determine if any additional statistical errors are present. They expect to announce any release of the final results only after error corrections are complete. Additional safety data is also expected from the CRO in four to six weeks from the December 19 announcement.

== Further clinical trial controversy ==
Results of the Phase III trial were published in the Journal of the American College of Surgeons January 2009 (electronic publication November 2008). There were claimed to be no significant difference in outcomes between the conventionally resuscitated group and the Polyheme-treated group. Concern about coronary ischaemia was addressed, and the uncomfortable fact that 3% of the polyheme group were reported to suffer myocardial infarction compared to only 1% in the control group was softened by a claim that a blinded committee of experts were unable to discern a difference between the groups. Investigators concluded that 'although there were more adverse events in the Polyheme group, the benefit-to-risk ratio of Polyheme is favorable when blood is needed but not available'.

Polyheme was rejected by the FDA in May 2009, leading to the closure of operations.

== See also ==
- Blood substitutes
- Blood transfusion
- Blood type
- Golden hour (medicine)
- Level I trauma center
- Northfield Laboratories
