= Blood plasma substitute =

A blood plasma substitute may refer to:

- An artificially made substance designed to have one or more of the vast amount of functions of the contents of the blood plasma
- Volume expander (although providing volume is only one of many functions of blood plasma)
