= Knocking (2006 film) =

- Poster
- Directed by: Joel Engardio; Tom Shepard
- Produced by: Joel Engardio; Tom Shepard
- Narrated by: Joel Engardio
- Cinematography: Howard Shack
- Edited by: Jim Klein
- Music by: Stephen Thomas Cavit
- Production companies: Open Door Productions; ITVS International
- Release date: May 1, 2006 (Indianapolis International Film Festival)
- Country: United States
- Language: English

Knocking is a 2006 documentary film directed by Joel Engardio and Tom Shepard that focuses on the civil liberties fought for by Jehovah's Witnesses. It focuses primarily on the stories of three Jehovah's Witnesses, and how their lives demonstrate three fundamental Witness teachings that have affected society in general: Conscientious objection, and rejection of blood transfusions and saluting the flag.

Knocking explored how Jehovah's Witnesses played a major role in First Amendment history, setting Supreme Court precedents that expanded individual liberties for all Americans.

In interviews, director Joel Engardio said Knocking is not about the theology of Jehovah's Witnesses but instead uses the religion as a case study to examine how disparate and disagreeable groups can hold their unique beliefs without marginalizing or limiting the freedom of others. "We may not be each others' cup of tea," Engardio said on NPR, "but tolerance allows a variety of kettles to peacefully share the stove."

Knocking won several film festival awards including Best Documentary at the USA Film Festival and was covered in Newsweek, USA Today and newspapers across the United States. Entertainment Weekly named it "What to Watch." Knocking was broadcast in the United States on PBS. It was also broadcast in Australia, Canada, Greece and Israel. Knocking was released on DVD in English, Spanish, Portuguese, Russian and Korean.

== Criticism ==
Critics of Jehovah's Witnesses said the film did not deal harshly enough with controversies surrounding the religion, like the practice of disfellowshiping. Engardio told film festival audiences that Knocking contained criticism organic to the film's story. Engardio has written Washington Post essays critical of Jehovah's Witness practices, including shunning and refusal of blood transfusions. Engardio has also written essays for the Washington Post and USA Today about civil rights issues involving Jehovah's Witnesses outside the scope of his film. Most notable was the 2010 ruling by a federal judge that overturned California's ban on gay marriage, in which the key legal precedent cited by the judge was a 1943 Supreme Court case won by Jehovah's Witnesses. Another Washington Post essay by Engardio warns that a ban on Jehovah's Witnesses in Russia is a dangerous precedent that could lead to the loss of freedoms for other unpopular groups in the emerging democracy.

== Main characters ==
Lillian Gobitas
As a girl in Pennsylvania, she and thousands of other Witness children's refusal to salute the flag of the United States initiated controversy that led to a pivotal U.S. Supreme Court ruling on freedom of religion.

Joseph Kempler
Born a Jew, he converted to the Jehovah's Witness faith after observing their integrity alongside Jews in Nazi concentration camps during World War II. After converting, Kempler remained distant from his daughter who had been raised by Jewish relatives. To draw his family closer together, Kempler took them on a trip to Europe to see his home country and visit the Melk and Auschwitz concentration camps.

Seth Thomas
A 23-year-old Witness who, despite the risk and opposition from non-Witness relatives, refused blood transfusions with his liver transplant operation. While initially refused treatment by the Baylor University Medical Center of Texas, surgeons with the University of Southern California University Hospital in Los Angeles agreed to perform the operation, believing that research in bloodless surgery is necessary and should be explored.

== Film Festival awards ==
- Best Documentary, Jury Award, 2006 USA Film Festival (Dallas)
- Best Documentary, Jury Award, 2006 Trenton Film Festival (New Jersey)
- Best Documentary, Audience Award, 2006 Indianapolis International Film Festival
- Best First Film, 2006 Long Island International Film Expo

== See also ==
- Jehovah's Witnesses beliefs
- List of Holocaust films
