= Decalin =

- Decalin

Names
- Preferred IUPAC name Decahydronaphthalene
- Other names Bicyclo[4.4.0]decane

Identifiers
CAS Number	91-17-8
3D model (JSmol)	Interactive image; cis: Interactive image; trans: Interactive image
Beilstein Reference	878165
ChEBI	CHEBI:38853; cis: CHEBI:38860; trans: CHEBI:38863
ChEMBL	ChEMBL1491920
ChemSpider	6777
ECHA InfoCard	100.001.861
EC Number	202-046-9, 207-770-9, 207-771-4
Gmelin Reference	185147
PubChem CID	7044
RTECS number	QJ3150000
UNII	88451Q4XYF
UN number	1147
CompTox Dashboard (EPA)	DTXSID1024912
- InChI: InChI=1S/C10H18/c1-2-6-10-8-4-3-7-9(10)5-1/h9-10H,1-8H2 Key: NNBZCPXTIHJBJL-UHFFFAOYSA-N; InChI=1/C10H18/c1-2-6-10-8-4-3-7-9(10)5-1/h9-10H,1-8H2 Key: NNBZCPXTIHJBJL-UHFFFAOYAH
- SMILES: C1CCC2CCCCC2C1; cis: C1CC[C@H]2CCCC[C@H]2C1; trans: C1CC[C@H]2CCCC[C@@H]2C1

Properties
Chemical formula	C_{10}H_{18}
Molar mass	138.254 g·mol^{−1}
Appearance	colorless liquid
Odor	slight, resembling menthol
Density	cis: 0.8965 g/cm^{3}; trans: 0.8659 g/cm^{3}
Melting point	cis: −42.9 °C (−45.2 °F; 230.2 K); trans: −30.4 °C (−22.7 °F; 242.8 K)
Boiling point	cis: 195.8 °C (384.4 °F; 468.9 K); trans: 187.3 °C (369.1 °F; 460.4 K)
Solubility in water	Insoluble
Solubility in Ethanol	cis: Miscible; trans: Very soluble
Solubility in Diethyl ether	Very soluble
Solubility in Acetone	Very soluble
Solubility in Chloroform	cis: Very soluble
Solubility in Benzene	trans: Miscible
Solubility in Methanol	trans: Soluble
log P	4.79
Vapor pressure	1.3 mbar (1.3 hPa) (22 °C (72 °F; 295 K)); 42 mmHg (5.6 kPa) (92 °C (198 °F; 365 K)); 741 mmHg (98.8 kPa) (188 °C (370 °F; 461 K))
Magnetic susceptibility (χ)	cis: −107.0×10^{−6} cm^{3}/mol; trans: −107.7×10^{−6} cm^{3}/mol
Refractive index (n_{D})	cis: 1.4810; trans: 1.4695
Viscosity	3 mPa·s (20 °C (68 °F; 293 K))

Structure
Point group	cis: C_{2}; trans: C_{2h}

Hazards
- GHS labelling
Pictograms	(GHS02: Flammable) (GHS05: Corrosive) (GHS06: Toxic) (GHS08: Health hazard) (GHS09: Environmental hazard)
Signal word	Danger
Hazard statements	H226, H304, H314, H331, H410
Precautionary statements	P210, P233, P240, P241, P242, P243, P261, P264, P271, P273, P280, P301+P310, P301+P330+P331, P303+P361+P353, P304+P340+P310, P305+P351+P338+P310, P363, P370+P378, P391, P403+P233, P403+P235, P405, P501
NFPA 704 (fire diamond)	3 2 1
Flash point	57 °C (135 °F; 330 K)
Autoignition temperature	250 °C (482 °F; 523 K)
Explosive limits	0.7%–4.9% (100 °F (38 °C; 311 K))
- Lethal dose or concentration (LD, LC)
LD_{50} (median dose)	4170 mg/kg (oral, rat); 5200 mg/kg (dermal, rabbit)
LC_{50} (median concentration)	4.08 mg/L (inhalation, rat)

Related compounds
Related compounds	Naphthalene; Tetralin
- Except where otherwise noted, data are given for materials in their standard state (at 25 °C [77 °F], 100 kPa). verify (what is ?) Infobox references

Decalin (decahydronaphthalene, also known as bicyclo[4.4.0]decane and sometimes decaline), a bicyclic organic compound, is an industrial solvent. A colorless liquid with an aromatic odor, it is used as a solvent for many resins or fuel additives.

== Isomers ==
Decalin occurs in cis and trans forms. The trans form is energetically more stable because of fewer steric effects. cis-Decalin is a chiral molecule without a chiral center; it has a two-fold rotational symmetry axis, but no reflective symmetry. However, the chirality is canceled through a chair-flipping process that turns the molecule into its mirror image.

1: trans (left) and cis (right) isomers

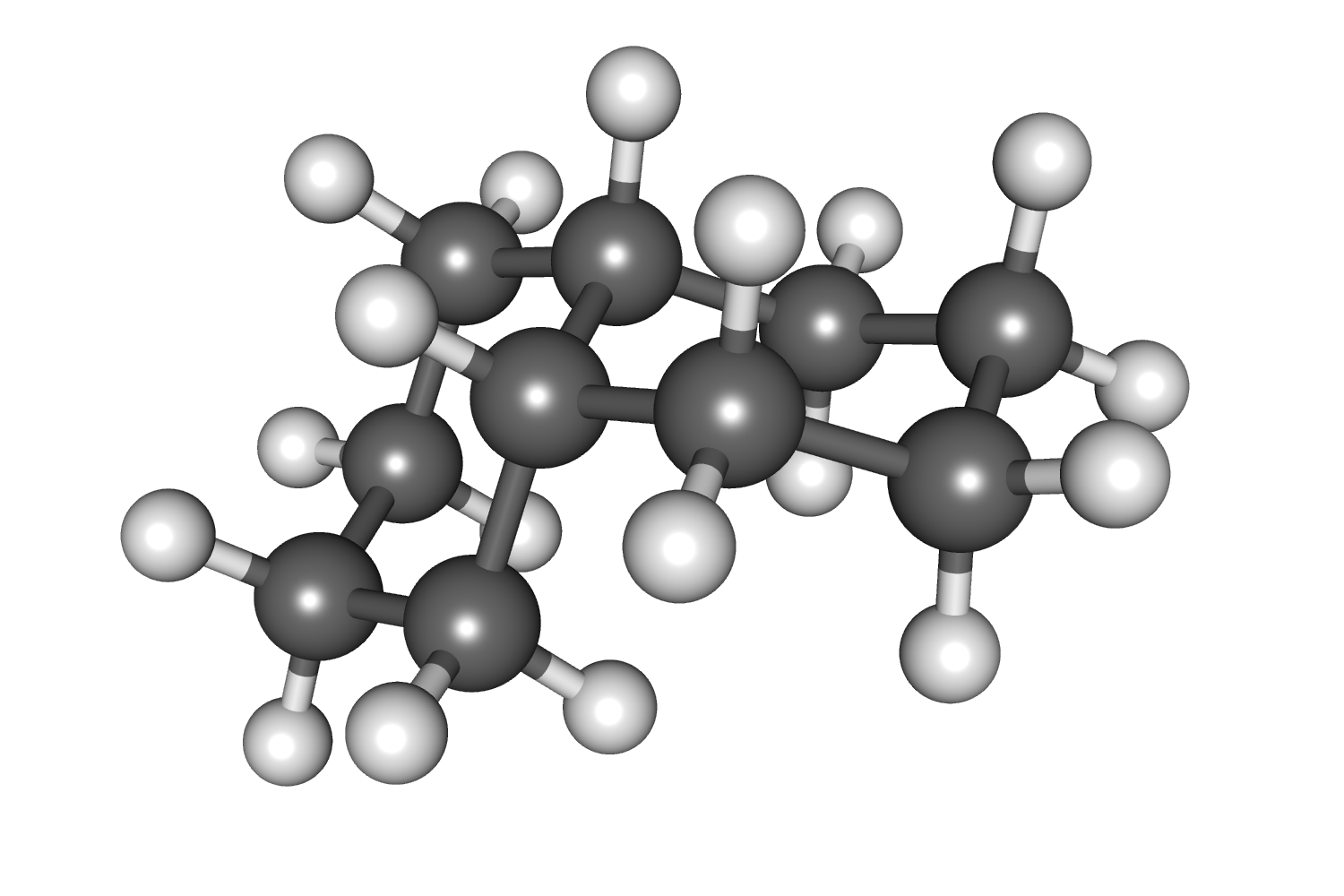
2:
ball-and-stick model of cis-decalin

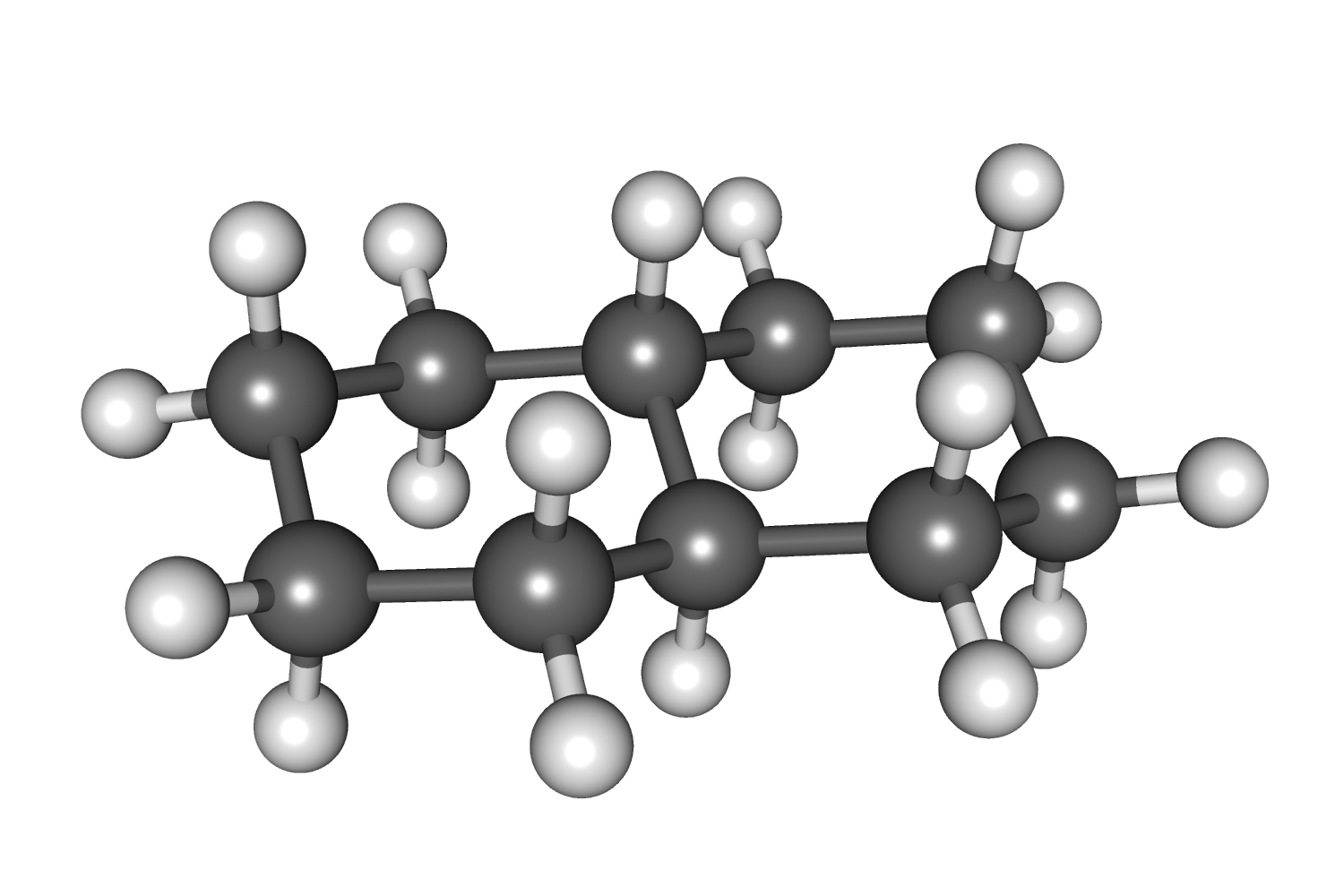
3:
trans-decalin

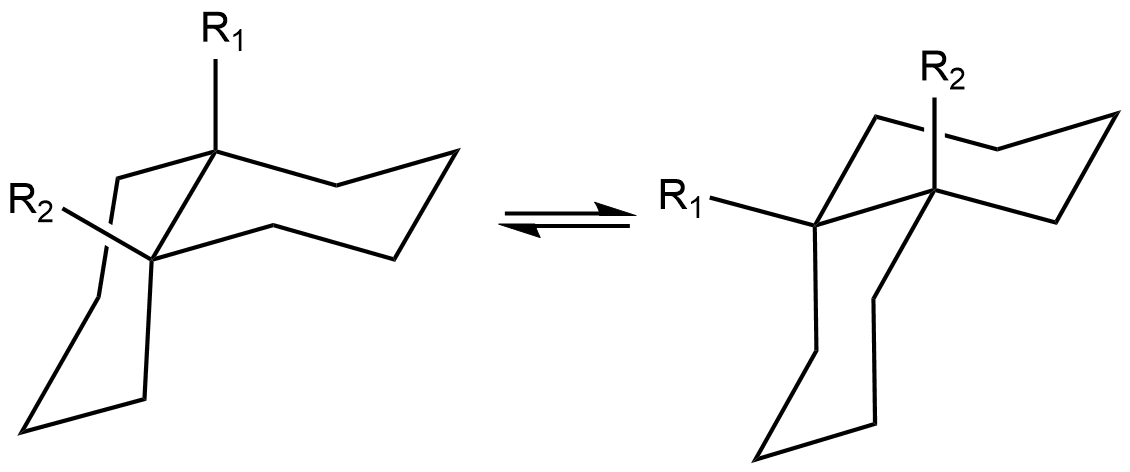
4:
cis-decalin ring-flip

== Synthesis ==
Decalin is the saturated analog of naphthalene and can be prepared from it by hydrogenation in the presence of a catalyst. This interconversion has been considered in the context of hydrogen storage.

== Occurrence ==
Decalin itself is rare in nature but several decalin derivatives are known. They arise via terpene-derived precursors or polyketides.

== Reactions ==
Oxygenation of decalin gives the tertiary hydroperoxide, which rearranges via hydroxycyclodecanone to cyclodecenone, a precursor to sebacic acid.

== Safety ==
Decalin easily forms explosive hydroperoxides upon storage in the presence of air.

== See also ==
- Dialin
- Geosmin
- Perfluorodecalin
