= Northfield Laboratories =

Northfield Laboratories Inc.
- Founded: 1985
- Defunct: May 9, 2009
- Headquarters: Evanston, Illinois
- Products: PolyHeme

Northfield Laboratories Inc. (former NASDAQ: NFLD) was the maker of PolyHeme, a hemoglobin-based oxygen carrier (HBOC). The company was based in Evanston, Illinois, with Dr. Steven A. Gould as its chief executive officer. As of May 31, 2005, the company had 68 employees.

It was founded in 1985 and was mainly a research and development company. Northfield's only product was PolyHeme, an oxygen-carrying blood substitute, which failed to receive Food and Drug Administration (FDA) regulatory approval. On May 9, 2009, after being informed by the FDA the product's risks outweighed the benefits, the company shut down operations. During their operations, they incurred losses of about 220 million dollars. The corporation was also criticized for some design elements of its clinical trials related to the need to perform critical care and resuscitation while patients were in grave clinical conditions due to the mechanisms of injury incurred and the consequent inability of patients to provide informed consent for treatment.

== See also ==
- Clinical trial
- Urgent care
- Unethical Human Experimentation in the United States
