= The Children Act (novel) =

2014 novel by Ian McEwan

- First edition (UK)
- Author: Ian McEwan
- Cover artist: Gilles Peress (Magnum Photos)
- Language: English
- Publisher: Jonathan Cape (UK); Nan A. Talese (US)
- Publication date: 2 Sept 2014 (UK); 9 Sept 2014 (US)
- Publication place: United Kingdom
- Pages: 224 pages
- ISBN: 978-0-224-10199-8

The Children Act is a novel by the English writer Ian McEwan. It was published on 2 September 2014. The title is a reference to the Children Act 1989, a UK Act of Parliament. The book has been compared to Charles Dickens's Bleak House, with its similar settings, and opening lines.

== Plot ==
Fiona Maye is a respected High Court Judge specialising in Family Law and living in Gray's Inn Square. While reviewing a case, she is approached by her husband, Jack, who tells her that because of their lack of physical intimacy he would like to embark on a perfect affair, with her permission, with a 28-year-old statistician. Fiona is horrified and refuses to agree to Jack's terms. Fiona had developed a horror of the body after presiding over a case in which she ruled that conjoined twins should be separated despite the fact that one twin would immediately die due to her verdict. Though her peers lauded her elegant solution to the case, Fiona is privately troubled by it but nevertheless refuses to share this detail with Jack. In the middle of their fight, Fiona receives a call about an emergency case of a young teenager with leukaemia who refuses a blood transfusion as a member of Jehovah's Witnesses. Jack leaves the apartment.

Going to work Fiona finds herself pondering her marriage, her childlessness (in part due to her dedication to her career). Impulsively she decides to change the locks to her home despite knowing that this is illegal. Returning home she realizes that Jack has not returned or tried to contact her.

The following day Fiona hears arguments for the case involving Adam, the young Jehovah's Witness. As he is only three months shy of his 18th birthday Fiona decides to visit him in the hospital to try to ascertain whether he is capable of denying treatment or not. She finds him a precocious and kind boy and he reads her poetry and plays a tune on his violin with her, with Fiona joining him by singing to his playing in an encore. Returning to court she rules that the hospital be allowed to give him the blood transfusion. Feeling elated with her decision she walks home and, upon returning, discovers that Jack has returned feeling foolish about his attempts to leave her. Fiona realizes that everything will eventually go back to normal and is ultimately disappointed that he returned at a time when she was happy and actually anticipating being alone.

Months later Fiona's marriage is still tense. She begins to receive letters, at first at her work, and later at her apartment, from Adam Henry, telling her he is now grateful for her ruling and that he sees the hypocrisy in his parents and has become disillusioned with religion. Fiona decides to ignore the letters. Travelling to Newcastle to oversee local cases, she is surprised to find that Adam has followed her there, desperate to talk to her. Adam eventually confesses that he has left home and wants to live with Fiona. She refuses his request and tells him to call his mother. Arranging for a taxi and a train ticket she goes to kiss him on the cheek goodbye, but the two end up kissing on the lips. Panicked after the kiss, Fiona calls her husband to arrange for dinner when she returns and the two begin to reconcile.

Returning home Fiona and Jack slowly grow closer to one another. Fiona receives another letter from Adam, a religious poem, which implies that he thinks of her as Satan for tempting him away from religion and has returned to the faith. Like his other letters, Fiona ignores it.

Fiona prepares for a Christmas concert to be performed before her colleagues. The night before the concert she and Jack reconcile with a kiss and promise to dedicate themselves to each other anew. Going to the concert, before she performs, Fiona is informed that Adam has died after his leukaemia returned and he refused treatment, now being of the age of majority. Fiona performs at the concert and then runs home. When Jack returns she tells him of the case, the kiss, and his death, feeling guilty for kissing Adam and then turning him away causing him to go back to his religious convictions. She falls asleep crying in her own bed, but when she wakes up Jack has followed her and he promises to love her as she reveals further details about her guilt.

== Inspiration ==
McEwan explains his inspiration in an essay he wrote for The Guardian which begins,

"Some years ago I found myself at dinner with a handful of judges – a bench is the collective noun. They were talking shop, and I was politely resisting the urge to take notes... How easily, I thought at the time, this bench could be mistaken for a group of novelists discussing each other's work, reserving harsher strictures for those foolish enough to be absent. At one point, our host, Sir Alan Ward, an appeal court judge, wanting to settle some mild disagreement, got up and reached from a shelf a bound volume of his own judgments. An hour later, when we had left the table for coffee, that book lay open on my lap. It was the prose that struck me first. Clean, precise, delicious. Serious, of course, compassionate at points, but lurking within its intelligence was something like humour, or wit, derived perhaps from its godly distance, which in turn reminded me of a novelist's omniscience."

== Reception ==
- The Guardian's Kate Kellaway believes this to be "the best novel he has written since On Chesil Beach" and goes on to say, "He leads us in one direction, then points us in another. And what one especially prizes is this ability to turn on his heel, change everything within a sentence or a well-placed word. From the start of this masterly novel, there is a larger sense, as Fiona lies on her chaise longue, that an elegantly established equilibrium is about to be rocked" and concludes "He keeps us tensely guessing – everything hingeing on Fiona's decision about the boy. And it will not spoil the plot to say that this is a novel which, above all, considers what it might mean to be saved – and not in the sense in which Jehovah's witnesses have claimed the word."
- Tessa Hadley, also writing in The Guardian, enjoys the novel's presentation of "a succession of particular cases from the family division in all their fascinating detail, along with the legal precedents and the issues they raise." but complains that "the digressions make the flow of life in The Children Act feel oddly halting, and, although the plotting is intricate, there's nothing in the writing of Fiona's private life that is as interesting as the legal arguments...The problem is the novel's prose seems not so much to imitate the flow of Fiona's experience, as to offer a fairly pedestrian summary."
- James Walton in The Telegraph criticizes the McEwan, concluding that, "By my reckoning, there are at least three highly implausible twists as he strives, with diminishing returns, to push The Children Act into a novel. None is justified either by his obvious desire to remind us of religion's annoying persistence, or by Fiona's childlessness, often a sign of human incompleteness in his work. The book still contains plenty of good, typically precise writing...Yet, in the end – especially given the choice of Jehovah's Witnesses as the chief target – the feeling persists that McEwan's considerable intellectual and literary firepower is here being used for little more than shooting fish in a barrel."
- Sam Leith in Literary Review writes "The writer's hand is always there: you're aware of McEwan's workmanlike crisscrossing of his themes – parenting, moral responsibility, the austerity of law and messiness of life, the moving power of art (the boy's poetry; Fiona's piano-playing) and so on. It never descends to being a thesis novel, but you're definitely conscious of McEwan moving the pieces around on the chessboard. Scene by scene, The Children Act is grounded and plausible. McEwan's prose has all the quiet mastery to which his readers have become accustomed. Fiona herself is completely realised, and the description of the fissure in her marriage entirely convincing and well developed. But Adam – at least to my mind – is less well rounded and the connection between the two sides of the story seems willed rather than organic. The whole assemblage still feels, by Ian McEwan's own highest standards, a little bit thin."
- Cressida Connoelly in The Spectator was even more negative, with the strapline "Improbable, unconvincing and lazy – Ian McEwan's latest is unforgivable...The characterisation is scant and the writing poor, and he never gives religion a chance"
- Nick Romeo in The Daily Beast was also negative: "He seems to behold his characters more than inhabit them, and this creates a sterile distance, a sense of reading a summary of others' misfortune. Her case just feels like one of many, not fundamentally different than the ones she considers. The story is schematic and contrived rather than palpable and lived."

== Film adaptation ==
A film adaptation of the novel was released in 2017. It is directed by Richard Eyre and stars Emma Thompson and Stanley Tucci.

== See also ==
- Children Act 1989 (legislation)
- Informed consent
- Sally Clark (real life victim of a tragic miscarriage of justice mentioned in the Chapter Two)
