= Alan Ward (judge) =

English judge (born 1938)

Sir Alan Hylton Ward (born 15 February 1938) is a former judge of the Court of Appeal of England and Wales.

== Early life and education ==
Ward was born and raised in South Africa and practised as an Attorney of the Supreme Court (solicitor), occasionally being instructed by Nelson Mandela and Oliver Tambo. In 1961, he moved to England to take a second degree, reading law at Cambridge.

== Legal career ==
He was called to the bar (Gray's Inn) in 1964, becoming a bencher in 1988, and was made a Queen's Counsel in 1984. Ward was appointed a High Court judge on 5 October 1988. He was assigned to the Family Division and given the customary knighthood. On 13 February 1995, he was appointed a Lord Justice of Appeal. He reached mandatory retirement on 15 February 2013.

== Notable rulings ==
=== Separating conjoined twins ===
In 2000, Ward, together with Lord Justice Brooke and Lord Justice Walker (now Lord Walker of Gestingthorpe) made the decision to separate conjoined twins Gracie and Rosie Attard, refusing their parents' appeal, despite the fact the weaker twin (Rosie) would certainly die. After the surgery, Rosie died and Gracie Attard survived and returned to her native Malta. This case was one of the inspirations for Ian McEwan's book The Children Act, with Ward later acting as an advisor during the production of the film adaptation.

=== Solicitors bills ===
In Ralph Hume Garry (a firm) v Gwillim 2002 EWCA Civ 1500, a client sued for outstanding legal fees appealed against a refusal at first instance to strike out the claim against him on the basis that most of the bills did not bona fide comply with section 64 of the Solicitors Act 1974. The judgment contained a lengthy discussion by Ward LJ of the statutory history and the development of the case law with respect to the requirements for solicitors' bills.

Ward reaffirmed the well-established requirement that a solicitor's bill must allow the client to have sufficient information to decide whether to seek taxation, and held that the proper principle was that there must be something in the written bill to indicate the ambit of the work, but that inadequacies in the bill of description of the work done may be redressed by accompanying documents or the client's knowledge. The appeal was dismissed as each bill was obviously and latterly expressly for professional charges, and also identified the matter and the periods of time they applied to. Therefore, the claim should not be struck out as the issue of adequacy of the bills (together with the client's knowledge) was a triable matter.

=== Sex discrimination ===
In a landmark ruling on 21 December 2004, Ward, together with Lord Justice Baker and Lady Justice Arden—on the basis of EU Council Directive 79/7/EEC—also ruled against the Secretary of State for Work and Pensions on the ground of sex discrimination for withholding from a separated father with shared care of his child receipt of the appropriate Job Seeker's Allowance child additions (JSA) because he was not in receipt of Child Benefit for his child.

== Family life ==
He is married to leading London divorce solicitor, Helen Ward. The couple has homes in Little Venice and Suffolk They had twin daughters: Amelia (who died in 2001 aged 16 in a rock-fall accident in South Africa) and Kate.
