= Erythromer =

ErythroMer is a red blood cell substitute in development by KaloCyte, supported with funding by the National Institutes of Health, U.S. Department of Defense, and private investment. Similar to other hemoglobin-based oxygen carriers, the product is stable for several months even when freeze-dried. It can be reconstituted from this lyophilized state in emergencies. This opens up the possibility of eventual stockpiling of ErythroMer, making it easier to supply blood in large amounts to those who need it.

The development of this technology was done at Washington University in St. Louis and University of Illinois Urbana-Champaign. Trials have been successful in rats, mice, and rabbits, and human trials are planned.

ErythroMer is a reddish blood powder composed of hemoglobin from humans. By coating it with a synthetic polymer, it can sense pH changes, allowing for oxygen pick up in areas where the pH levels are high and disposal where they are low.

In the spring of 2024, ErythroMer showed promise in pre-clinical testing. In animal testing, it effectively delivered oxygen and helped revive animals with significant blood loss.

In 2025, KaloCyte announced a licensing agreement with Chrysea for ErythroMer production.
