= Blood substitute =

Substance that is used in place of biological blood

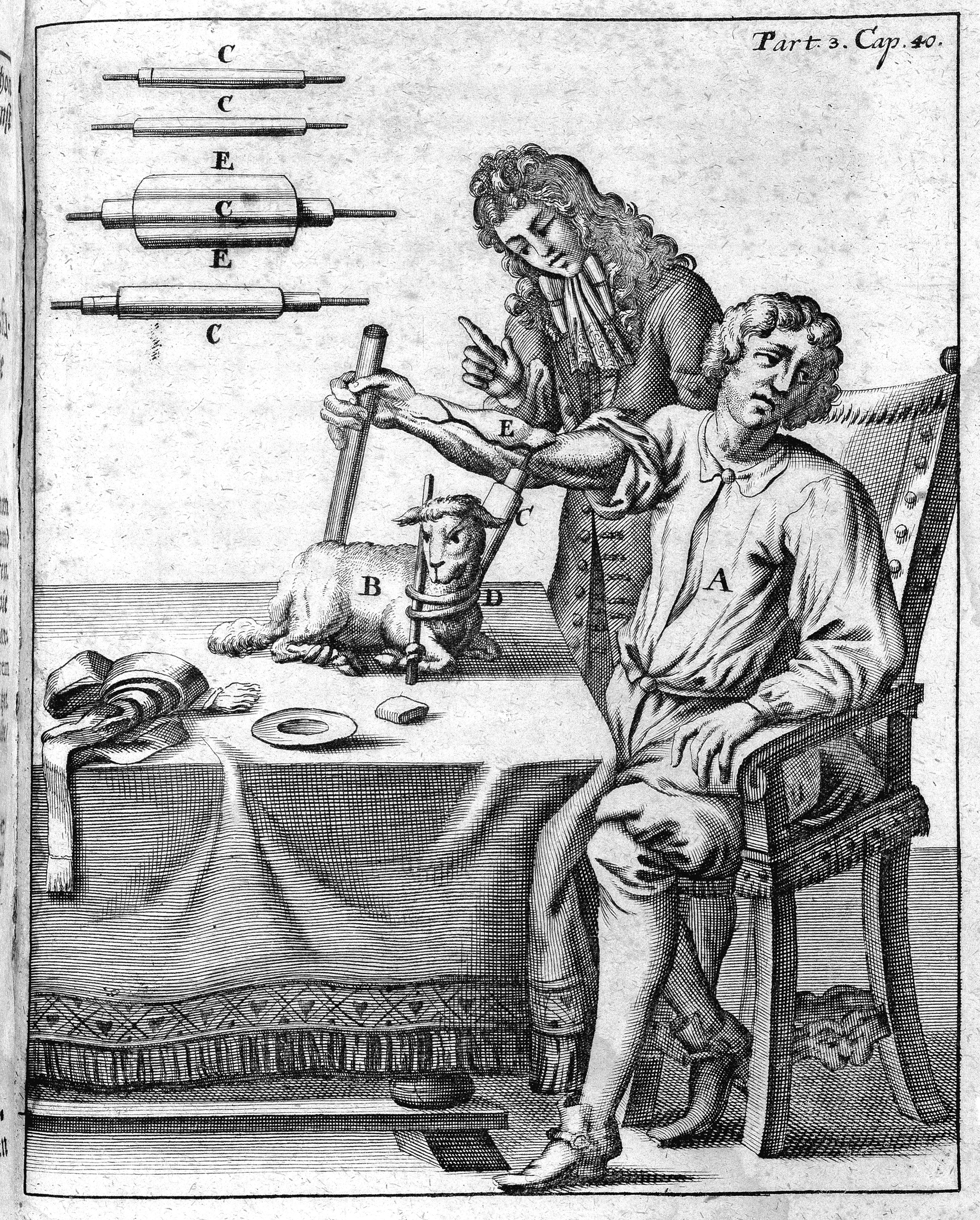
An early blood transfusion from lamb to man, by Matthäus Gottfried Purmann. Source: Wellcome Collection

A blood substitute (also called artificial blood or blood surrogate) is a substance used to mimic and fulfill some functions of biological blood. In some cases, it can serve as an alternative to blood transfusion, a therapy using donated blood or blood-based products.

When referring to blood substitutes that are oxygen-carrying, the term oxygen therapeutics is increasingly used to emphasize their intended primary use in treating severe anemia. Such blood substitutes must compensate for oxygen's poor solubility, due to which dissolved oxygen typically accounts for only a fraction of oxygen transport; in humans, hemoglobin is the most important oxygen carrier. There are two categories of oxygen-carrying blood substitutes being pursued: hemoglobin-based oxygen carriers (HBOC) and perfluorocarbon-based products. As of yet, there are no standard oxygen therapeutics in use internationally, although in various countries several enjoy limited approval for specific applications or are undergoing clinical trials.

== History ==
For centuries, an assortment of different fluids were used as blood substitutes, including beer, plant resins, non-human blood, and human urine. Where blood transfusion was practiced, unpredictable, fatal reactions sometimes occurred (now identified as hemolytic reactions to transfusion). While there were developments in the area, such as William Harvey's description of the blood circulation system in the early 17th century and significant advances in the understanding of the mechanism of oxygen transport and tissue oxygenation in the 18th and 19th centuries, the idea of blood types was only introduced at the beginning of the 20th century by Karl Landsteiner. In many instances physicians thus sought to find less-risky alternatives, resulting in experiments such as the 1870s transfusion of milk in the United States.

Research into blood substitutes to replace blood transfusion has been driven by several factors in recent years. The emergence of HIV and discovery of mad cow disease in the 1980s brought fresh concerns over blood product safety. Additionally, blood shortages have become increasingly common, even where well-established systems exist. The constraints of blood storage, including a limited shelf-life and need for constant refrigeration, make its transport difficult.

In 2023, DARPA announced funding for twelve universities and labs for synthetic blood research. Human trials would be expected to happen between 2028 and 2030.

== Approaches ==
Efforts have focused on molecules that can carry oxygen, and most work has focused on recombinant hemoglobin, which normally carries oxygen, and perfluorocarbons (PFC), chemical compounds which can carry and release oxygen.

The first approved oxygen-carrying blood substitute was a perfluorocarbon-based product called Fluosol-DA-20, developed by Ryōichi Naitō and manufactured by his company, Green Cross of Japan. It was approved by the Food and Drug Administration (FDA) in 1989. Because of limited success, complexity of use and side effects, it was withdrawn in 1994. However, Fluosol-DA remains the only oxygen therapeutic ever fully approved by the FDA. As of 2017, no hemoglobin-based product had been approved.

=== Perfluorocarbon based ===
Perfluorochemicals are not water soluble and will not mix with blood, therefore emulsions must be made by dispersing small drops of PFC in water. This liquid is then mixed with antibiotics, vitamins, nutrients and salts, producing a mixture that contains about 80 different components, and performs many of the vital functions of natural blood. PFC particles are about 1/40 the size of the diameter of a red blood cell (RBC). This small size can enable PFC particles to traverse capillaries through which no RBCs are flowing. In theory this can benefit damaged, blood-starved tissue, which conventional red cells cannot reach. PFC solutions can carry oxygen so well that mammals including humans, can survive breathing liquid PFC solution, called liquid breathing.

Perfluorocarbon-based blood substitutes are completely man-made. This provides advantages over blood substitutes that rely on modified hemoglobin, such as unlimited manufacturing capabilities, ability to be heat-sterilized, and PFCs' efficient oxygen delivery and carbon dioxide removal. PFCs in solution act as an intravascular oxygen carrier to temporarily augment oxygen delivery to tissues. PFCs are removed from the bloodstream within 48 hours by the body's normal clearance procedure for particles in the blood – exhalation. PFC particles in solution can carry several times more oxygen per cubic centimeter (cc) than blood, while being 40 to 50 times smaller than hemoglobin.

Fluosol was made mostly of perfluorodecalin or perfluorotributylamine suspended in an albumin emulsion. It was developed in Japan and first tested in the United States in November 1979. In order to "load" sufficient amounts of oxygen into it, people who had been given it had to breathe pure oxygen by mask or in a hyperbaric chamber. It was approved by the FDA in 1989, and was approved in eight other countries. Its use was associated with a reduction in ischemic complications and with an increase in pulmonary edema and congestive heart failure. Due to difficulty with the emulsion storage of Fluosol use (frozen storage and rewarming), its popularity declined and its production ended in 1994.

Name	Sponsor	Description
Oxycyte	Oxygen Biotherapeutics	Tested in a Phase II-b Trials in the United States. Targeted as an oxygen therapeutic rather than a blood substitute, with successful small-scale open label human trials treating traumatic brain injury at Virginia Commonwealth University. The trial was later terminated.
PHER-O_{2}	Sanguine Corp	In research
Perftoran	Russia	Contains perfluorodecalin and perfluoro-N-(4-methylcyclohexyl)-piperidine along with a surfactant, Proxanol-268. It was developed in Russia and as of 2005 was marketed there.
NVX-108	NuvOx Pharma	In a Phase Ib/II clinical trial where it raises tumor oxygen levels prior to radiation therapy in order to radiosensitize them.

Oxygent was a second-generation, lecithin-stabilized emulsion of a PFC that was under development by Alliance Pharmaceuticals. In 2002 a Phase III study was halted early due an increase in incidences of strokes in the study arm.

=== Haemoglobin based ===
Haemoglobin is the main component of red blood cells, comprising about 33% of the cell mass. Haemoglobin-based products are called haemoglobin-based oxygen carriers (HBOCs).

Unmodified cell-free haemoglobin is not useful as a blood substitute because its oxygen affinity is too high for effective tissue oxygenation, the half-life within the intravascular space that is too short to be clinically useful, it has a tendency to undergo dissociation in dimers with resultant kidney damage and toxicity, and because free haemoglobin tends to take up nitric oxide, causing vasoconstriction.

Efforts to overcome this toxicity have included making genetically engineered versions, cross-linking, polymerization, and encapsulation.

HemAssist, a diaspirin cross-linked haemoglobin (DCLHb) was developed by Baxter Healthcare; it was the most widely studied of the haemoglobin-based blood substitutes, used in more than a dozen animal and clinical studies. It reached Phase III clinical trials, in which it failed due to increased mortality in the trial arm, mostly due to severe vasoconstriction complications. The results were published in 1999.

Hemolink (Hemosol Inc., Mississauga, Canada) was a haemoglobin solution that contained cross-linked an o-rafinose polymerised human haemoglobin. Hemosol struggled after Phase II trials were halted in 2003 on safety concerns and declared bankruptcy in 2005.

Hemopure was developed by Biopure Corp and was a chemically stabilized, cross-linked bovine (cow) haemoglobin in a salt solution intended for human use; the company developed the same product under the trade name Oxyglobin for veterinary use in dogs. Oxyglobin was approved in the US and Europe and was introduced to veterinary clinics and hospitals in March 1998. Hemopure was approved in South Africa and Russia. Biopure filed for bankruptcy protection in 2009. Its assets were subsequently purchased by HbO2 Therapeutics in 2014.

PolyHeme was developed over 20 years by Northfield Laboratories and began as a military project following the Vietnam War. It is human haemoglobin, extracted from red blood cells, then polymerized, then incorporated into an electrolyte solution. In April 2009, the FDA rejected Northfield's Biologic License Application and in June 2009, Northfield filed for bankruptcy.

Dextran-Haemoglobin was developed by Dextro-Sang Corp as a veterinary product, and was a conjugate of the polymer dextran with human haemoglobin.

Hemotech was developed by HemoBiotech and was a chemically modified haemoglobin.

Somatogen developed a genetically engineered and crosslinked tetramer it called Optro. It failed in a phase II trial and development was halted.

A pyridoxylated Hb conjugated with polyoxyethylene was created by scientists at Ajinomoto and eventually developed by Apex Biosciences, a subsidiary of Curacyte AG; it was called "PHP" and failed in a Phase III trial published in 2014, due to increased mortality in the control arm, which led to Curacyte shutting down.

Similarly, Hemospan was developed by Sangart, and was a pegylated haemoglobin provided in a powdered form. While early trials were promising Sangart ran out of funding and closed down.

=== Stem cells ===
Stem cells offer a possible means of producing transfusable blood. A study performed by Giarratana et al. describes a large-scale ex-vivo production of mature human blood cells using hematopoietic stem cells. The cultured cells possessed the same haemoglobin content and morphology as native red blood cells. The authors contend that the cells had a near-normal lifespan, when compared to natural red blood cells.

Scientists from the experimental arm of the United States Department of Defense began creating artificial blood for use in remote areas and transfuse blood to wounded soldiers more quickly in 2010. The blood is made from the hematopoietic stem cells removed from the umbilical cord between human mother and newborn using a method called blood pharming. Pharming has been used in the past on animals and plants to create medical substances in large quantities. Each cord can produce approximately 20 units of blood. The blood is being produced for the Defense Advanced Research Projects Agency by Arteriocyte. The Food and Drug Administration has examined and approved the safety of this blood from previously submitted O-negative blood. Using this particular artificial blood will reduce the costs per unit of blood from $5,000 to equal or less than $1,000. This blood will also serve as a blood donor to all common blood types.

=== Synthetic O_{2} carriers ===
Unlike biologically based and perfluorinated solvent systems described above, a number of synthetic compounds have been evaluated for their ability to reversibly bind O_{2}. Beyond the medical applications, such O_{2} binding agents could be supply oxygen for welding and other uses. Cobalt analogues of myoglobin received particular attention; no practical results were found.

== See also ==
- Artificial Cells, Blood Substitutes, and Biotechnology
- Blood plasma substitute (disambiguation)
- Blood transfusion
- Bloodless surgery
- Erythromer
- Respirocyte
- Theatrical blood
- Vaska's complex: carries oxygen and hydrogen
- Jehovah's Witnesses and blood transfusions
