= Charles Pravaz =

French orthopedic surgeon

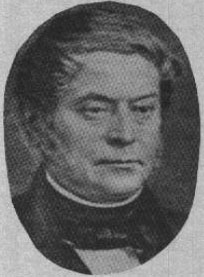
Pravaz, c. 1852

Charles Gabriel Pravaz (24 March 1791 – 24 June 1853) a French orthopedic surgeon, pioneered the hypodermic syringe.

While the concept dated to Galen, the modern syringe is thought to have originated in 15th-century Italy, although it took several centuries for the device to develop. In 1657 the Englishmen Christopher Wren and Robert Boyle conducted experiments on syringe-like devices, while about 1720 the French physician Dominique Anel developed the modern pump syringe as a device to clean wounds using suction.

Clinicians could not perform injections without an incision until Irish physician Francis Rynd invented the hollow needle in 1844. In 1853, wanting to inject iron perchloride coagulant into an aneurysm, Pravaz adapted Rynd's needle, rather than using the usual suction tube. Measuring 3 cm (1.18 in) long and 5 mm (0.2 in) in diameter, his syringe was entirely in silver, made by Établissements Charrière, and operated by a screw (rather than the plunger familiar today) to control the amount of substance injected.

The Scottish doctor Alexander Wood invented the syringe as used today - also in 1853. Wood's device, made of glass rather than silver, made it possible to see the amount and rate of flow of the fluid within it. It used a plunger rather than a screw mechanism to inject doses. As such it has barely changed since.

Pravaz died before he could publish an account of his invention, but another French surgeon, L. J. Béhier, would make Pravaz's discovery known across Europe, thus initiating the science of sclerotherapy and the treatment of varicose veins and other varices.
