= Hindustan Syringes & Medical Devices =

Indian medical equipment manufacturer

- Industry: Healthcare
- Founded: 1957; 69 years ago
- Headquarters: New Delhi, India
- Website: hmdhealthcare.com

Hindustan Syringes & Medical Devices is an Indian manufacturer of medical syringes. The company produces a type of syringe designed to enable efficient use of doses from the Pfizer–BioNTech COVID-19 vaccine.

The New Delhi factories have been producing 2.5 billion syringes a year, increasing their capacity because of the coronavirus pandemic. Two thirds of the capacity is for the market in India but there is global demand, increased by stockpiling, from the US and Europe where investment focused on the vaccine development rather than syringe manufacture. The United Nations is also being supplied for the COVAX programme. Before the pandemic, global production was about 16 billion syringes per annum but only 5 to 10 percent were used for vaccination and immunisation. Now 8 to 10 billion vaccination syringes are required.

To make best use of the Pfizer–BioNTech vaccine a dose no larger than 0.3 millilitres is required which allows six or even seven doses to be extracted from each vial. The device must also be a low dead space syringe so scarcely anything is left in the syringe after injection and the syringe itself must break after use so that there is no possibility of repeated use spreading infection. For this reason Japan ordered 15 million syringes at the beginning of 2021 and deliveries started within a month.

Hindustan Syringes & Medical Devices was established in 1957 and is a family run business. In 1995 new machines were required for an increase in production and so private capital was needed. The latest ramping up could be achieved very quickly because no further investment was required.
