= Low dead space syringe =

Type of syringe

A low dead space syringe (LDSS) or low dead-volume syringe is a type of syringe with a design that seeks to limit dead space that exists between the syringe hub and needle.

== Differences from high dead space syringes ==
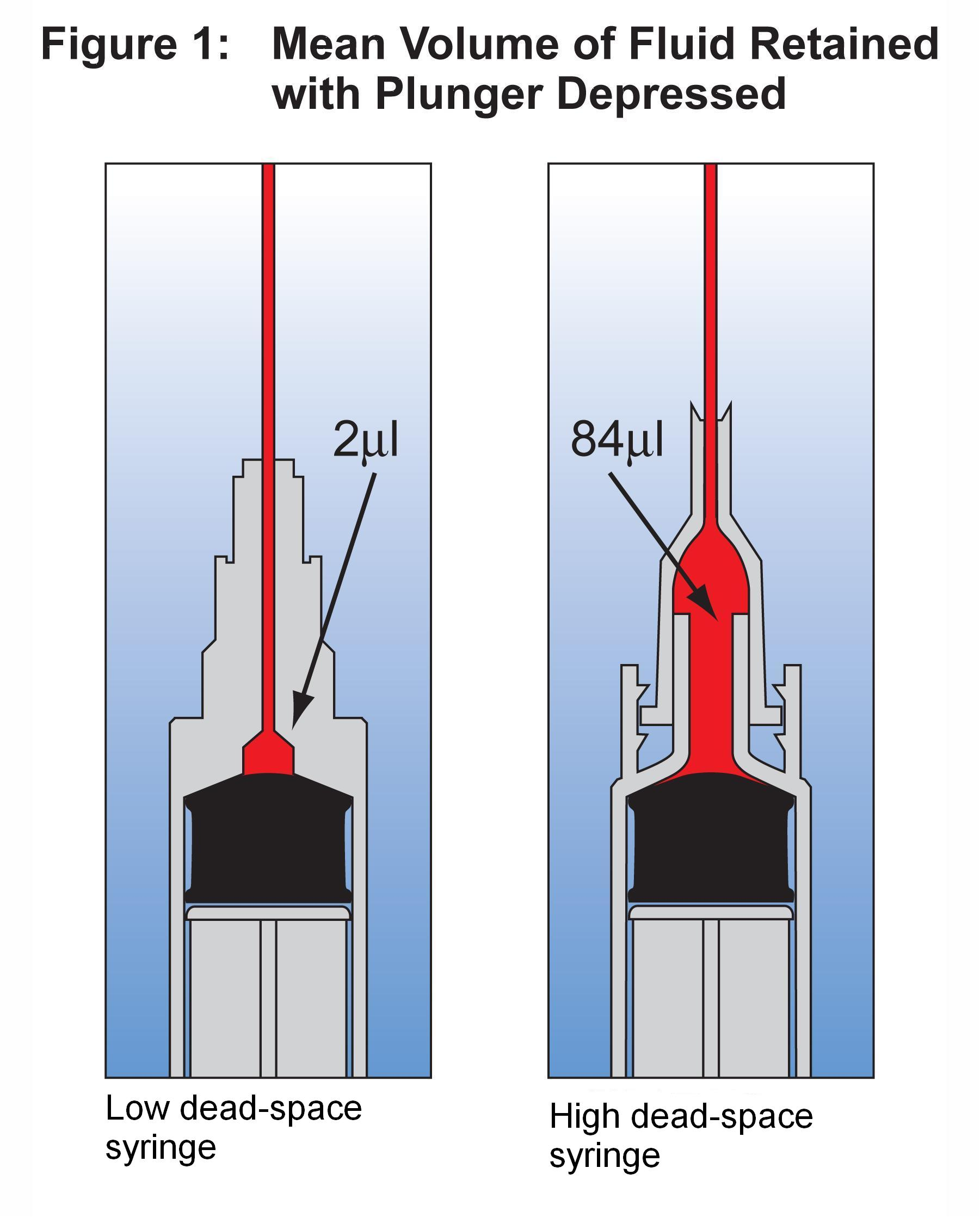
Example a low and high dead space syringe and the average fluid remaining after complete depression of the plunger.

The difference between high and low dead space syringes is determined by the average quantity of fluid that cannot be expelled from the device. Although no set standard for the designation of low dead space syringes and needles exists, it is the convention to designate any needle or syringe design that deviates from the standard needle and syringe design as low dead space if this new design yields a lower dead space.

As opposed to low dead space syringes, high dead space syringes are conventional needle and syringe designs. The term "high dead space" refers to the fluid remaining within the needle and between the syringe hub and the plunger. This space can be as high as 84 micro liters in conventional syringes. Conventional high dead space syringes have existed since the mass production of plastic syringes with removable needles in 1961.

However, there are problems associated with the dead space in syringes: medication waste, disease transmission, and inaccurate dosing. Specifically, there is some data to suggest that disease transmission for people who inject drugs and carry Hepatitis C virus can be reduced with the use of low dead space syringes. Low dead space syringes reduce this risk by minimizing the amount of space within the syringe for blood to enter.

== History ==
The first hypodermic needle was first used by Dr. Alexander Wood and immediately efforts were made to improve the design. It was not until 1954, with the need for massive syringe distribution of Dr. Salk's polio vaccine, that the first disposable syringes were created. Initially, they were made of glass. In 1961 plastic disposable syringes became available. The advent of the first low dead space syringe occurred with the creation of 1-ml syringes designed specifically for the administration of insulin. Then amongst the scare of HIV and rising concern of other communicable diseases to healthcare workers the creation of safety syringes occurred in 1988. As of the last few years new designs have emerged that work on a needle that is low dead space and fits onto and transforms high dead space syringes into low dead space syringes. One design achieves this by creating a plunger that inserts itself into the syringe neck to expel as much fluid as possible from the syringe body, thus reducing the amount of space available within the neck.

=== Various designs of low dead space syringes ===
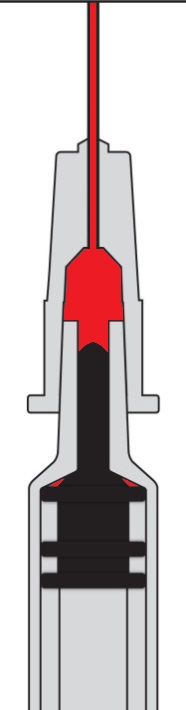
Standard high dead space needle and syringe with extended plunger

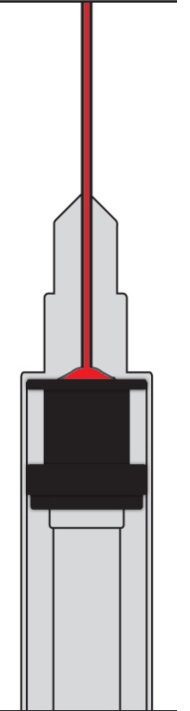
1-ml syringe, "insulin syringe"

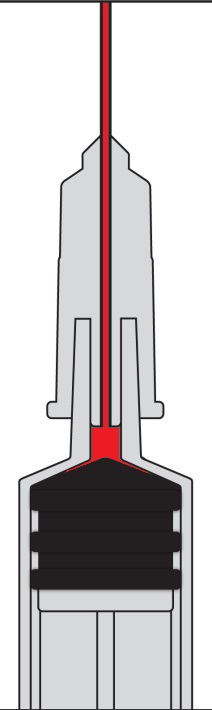
Standard high dead space syringe with low dead space needle

== Designs ==
=== Fixed needle design ===
The insulin syringe was the first syringe that is considered low dead space. It was initially created with low dead space for accurate measuring and mixing of fast and slow acting insulin, which had the added benefit of wasting as little of the expensive drug as possible. An attached short and small gauge needle was also designed into the syringe to prevent the needle from detaching during administration of insulin and to decrease pain from frequent injections.

=== Detachable needle design ===
Low dead space can be achieved in detachable syringes and needles through designing either the syringe or needle components to have low dead space.

Currently, the design of the low dead space needle incorporates a plastic neck that fits within the neck of a standard syringe hub.

A low dead space syringe is accomplished by using a standard syringe body with an extended plunger that inserts into the neck of the syringe body to expel more fluid from the syringe.

== WHO guidelines for people who inject drugs ==
According to WHO guidelines for people who inject drugs it is suggested that needle exchange programs provide low dead space syringes for distribution to people who inject drugs due to evidence that the provision of low dead space syringes leads to a reduction in the transmission of HIV, and hepatitis B and C.

== Benefits ==
- Reduced drug waste
- Increase of 2–19% additional vaccine doses per vial if current 10-dose flu vaccine vials are used, which in large flu vaccine campaigns suggests an instant increase of thousands to millions of additional persons who are vaccinated
- If 50% of people who inject drugs switch to low dead space syringes an estimated reduction of 33% of new HIV, and Hepatitis B and C infections will occur
- Reduced incidence of overdose in infants and premature babies
- Improved imaging of radiographic techniques

== Criticism of distribution ==
Critics of low dead space syringe distribution to needle exchange programs claim that real world pilot studies do not exist to support findings within labs. Some proponents point to America and its low prevalence of HIV and hepatitis among people who inject drugs and cite the reason for such low prevalence to low dead space syringes already being the standard preferred syringe in the United States and successful anti-needle sharing campaigns. Other critics argue that countries like Vietnam, where low dead space needles are distributed and available, have the highest rates of HIV among people who inject drugs. However, proponents claim that low dead space syringes are still difficult to get and many people who use low dead space syringes still use high dead space syringes and thus reduce the potential effect of using low dead space syringes.
