= Luer =

Luer (also Lüer) is a Germanic surname. It may refer to:

- Carlyle A. Luer (1922–2019), American botanist specializing in orchids
- Greg Luer (born 1994), English footballer
- Hermann Wülfing Luer (?–1883), German instrument maker; inventor of the Luer taper
- Hugo Gunckel Lüer (1901–1997), Chilean pharmacist, botanist, and university professor
- Karl-Hermann Lüer (1933–2014), German saxophonist and flautist
- Ludwig Luer (fl. WWI-era), German flying ace

== See also ==
- Luer taper, a system for making leak-free connections between pieces of medical or laboratory equipment
- Luers, people with this surname
