= Lueg =

Lueg is a surname. Notable people with the surname include:

- Ernst-Dieter Lueg (1930–2000), German writer and television journalist
- Werner Lueg (1931–2014), German runner

== See also ==
- Luer
