= Hypodermic needle =

Device to inject substances into the circulatory system

- Different bevels on hypodermic needles
- Classification: Medical device
- Industry: Healthcare
- Application: Injection
- Inventor: Francis Rynd
- Invented: 1844 (182 years ago)

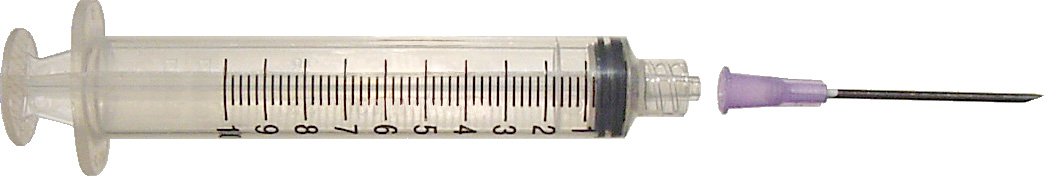
Syringe on left, hypodermic needle with attached colour coded Luer-Lock connector on right

Hypodermic needle features

A hypodermic needle (from Greek ὑπο- (hypo- = under), and δέρμα (derma = skin)) is a very thin, hollow tube with one sharp tip. As one of the most important intravenous inventions in the field of drug administration, it is one of a category of medical tools which pierce the skin, called sharps. It is commonly used with a syringe, a hand-operated device with a plunger, to inject substances into the body (e.g., saline solution, solutions containing various drugs or liquid medicines) or extract fluids from the body (e.g., blood). Large-bore hypodermic intervention is especially useful in catastrophic blood loss or treating shock. It was invented by Francis Rynd in 1844.

A hypodermic needle is used for rapid delivery of liquids, or when the injected substance cannot be ingested, either because it would not be absorbed (as with insulin), or because it would harm the liver. It is also useful to deliver certain medications that cannot be delivered orally due to vomiting. There are many possible routes for an injection, with intramuscular (into a muscle) and intravenous (into a vein) being the most common. A hypodermic syringe has the ability to retain liquid and blood in it up to years after the last use and a great deal of caution should be taken to use a new syringe every time.

The hypodermic needle also serves an important role in research environments where sterile conditions are required. The hypodermic needle significantly reduces contamination during inoculation of a sterile substrate. The hypodermic needle reduces contamination for two reasons: First, its surface is extremely smooth, which prevents airborne pathogens from becoming trapped between irregularities on the needle's surface, which would subsequently be transferred into the media (e.g. agar) as contaminants; second, the needle's surface is extremely sharp, which significantly reduces the diameter of the hole remaining after puncturing the membrane and consequently prevents microbes larger than this hole from contaminating the substrate.

== History ==
=== Early use and experimentation ===
The ancient Greeks and Romans knew injection as a method of medicinal delivery from observations of snakebites and poisoned weapons. There are also references to "anointing" and "inunction" in the Old Testament as well as the works of Homer, but injection as a legitimate medical tool was not truly explored until the 17th century.

Christopher Wren performed the earliest confirmed experiments with crude hypodermic needles, performing intravenous injection into dogs in 1656. These experiments consisted of using animal bladders (as the syringe) and goose quills (as the needle) to administer drugs such as opium intravenously to dogs. Wren and others' main interest was to learn if medicines traditionally administered orally would be effective intravenously. In the 1660s, Johann Daniel Major of Kiel and Johann Sigismund Elsholtz of Berlin were the first to experiment with injections in humans.

=== 19th-century development ===
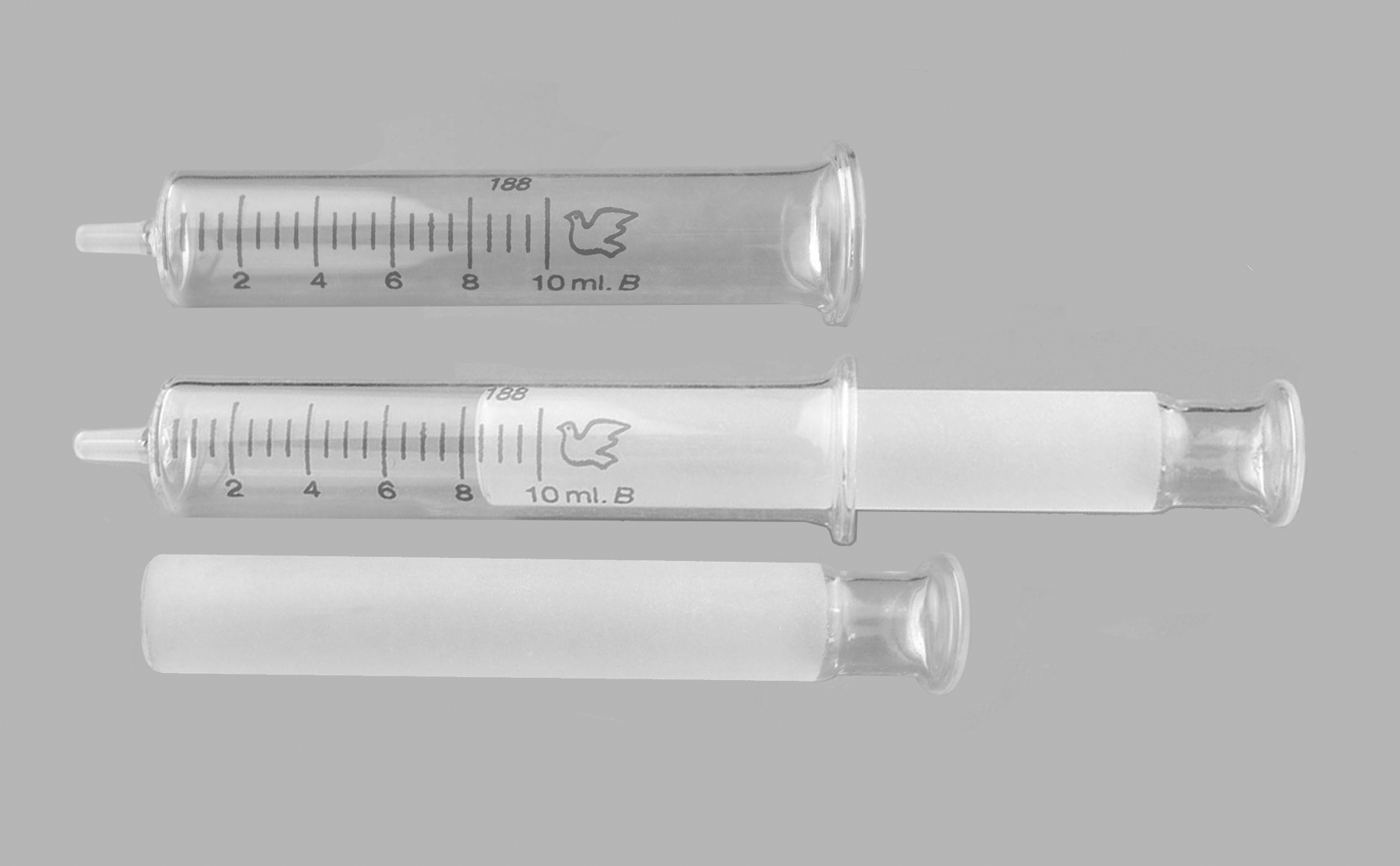
Syringe made entirely of glass, similar to the Wood design, except it is etched with volume marks.

The 19th century saw the development of medicines that were effective in small doses, such as opiates and strychnine. This spurred a renewed interest in direct, controlled application of medicine. "Some controversy surrounds the question of priority in hypodermic medication." Irish physician Francis Rynd is generally credited with the first successful injection in 1844, in the Meath Hospital in Dublin, Ireland.

Alexander Wood's main contribution was the all-glass syringe in 1851, which allowed the user to estimate dosage based on the levels of liquid observed through the glass. Wood used hypodermic needles and syringes primarily for the application of localized, subcutaneous injection (localized anesthesia) and therefore was not as interested in precise dosages.

Simultaneous to Wood's work in Edinburgh, Charles Pravaz of Lyon also experimented with sub-dermal injections in sheep using a syringe of his own design. Pravaz designed a hypodermic needle measuring 3 cm (1.18 in) long and 5 mm (0.2 in) in diameter; it was made entirely of silver.

Charles Hunter, a London surgeon, is credited with the coining of the term "hypodermic" to describe subcutaneous injection in 1858. The name originates from two Greek words: hypo, "under", and derma, "skin". Furthermore, Hunter is credited with acknowledging the systemic effects of injection after noticing that a patient's pain was alleviated regardless of the injection's proximity to the pained area. Hunter and Wood were involved in a lengthy dispute over not only the origin of the modern hypodermic needle, but also because of their disagreement as to the medicine's effect once administered.

=== Modern improvements ===
Francis Rynd used the first "Hollow Needle" as a hypodermic syringe on Margaret Cox in Ireland on June 3rd, 1844. Wood can be largely credited with the popularization and acceptance of injection as a medical technique, as well as the widespread use and acceptance of the hypodermic needle. The basic technology of the hypodermic needle has stayed largely unchanged since the 19th century, but as the years progressed and medical and chemical knowledge improved, small refinements have been made to increase safety and efficacy, with needles being designed and tailored for very particular uses. Hypodermic needles remain essential to large volume administration or exchange in settings of trauma or dialysis. The trend of needle specification for use began in the 1920s, particularly for the administration of insulin to diabetics.

The onset of World War II spurred the early development of partially disposable syringes for the administration of morphine and penicillin on the battlefield. Development of the fully disposable hypodermic needle was spurred on in the 1950s for several reasons. The Korean War created blood shortages and in response disposable, sterile syringes were developed for collecting blood. The widespread immunization against polio during the period required the development of a fully disposable syringe system.

The 1950s also saw the rise and recognition of cross-contamination from used needles. This led to the development of the first fully disposable plastic syringe by New Zealand pharmacist Colin Murdoch in 1956. This period also marked a shift in interest from needle specifications to general sterility and safety.

The 1980s saw the rise of the HIV epidemic and with it renewed concern over the safety of cross-contamination from used needles. New safety controls were designed on disposable needles to ensure the safety of medical workers in particular. These controls were implemented on the needles themselves, such as retractable needles, but also in the handling of used needles, particularly in the use of hard-surface disposal receptacles found in every medical office today.

By 2008, all-plastic needles were in production and in limited use. One version was made of Vectra (plastic) aromatic liquid crystal polymer tapered from 1.2 mm at the hub to 0.72 mm at the tip (equivalent to 22 gauge metal needle), with an ID/OD ratio of 70%.

== Manufacture ==
Hypodermic needles are normally made from a stainless-steel or Niobium tube through a process known as tube drawing where the tube is drawn through progressively smaller dies to make the needle. The end of the needle is bevelled to create a sharp pointed tip, letting the needle easily penetrate the skin.

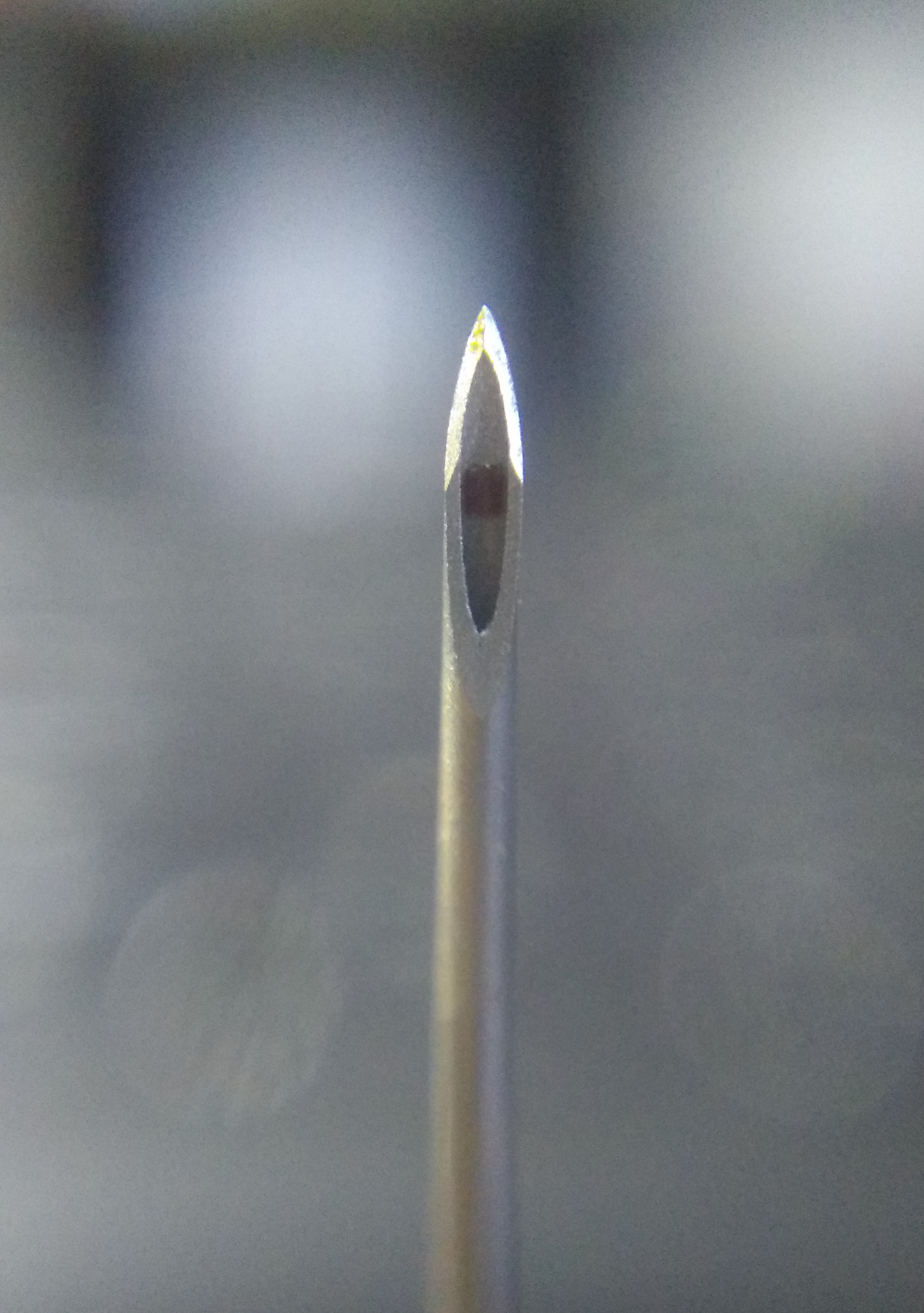
A hypodermic needle tip under microscope

== Gauge ==
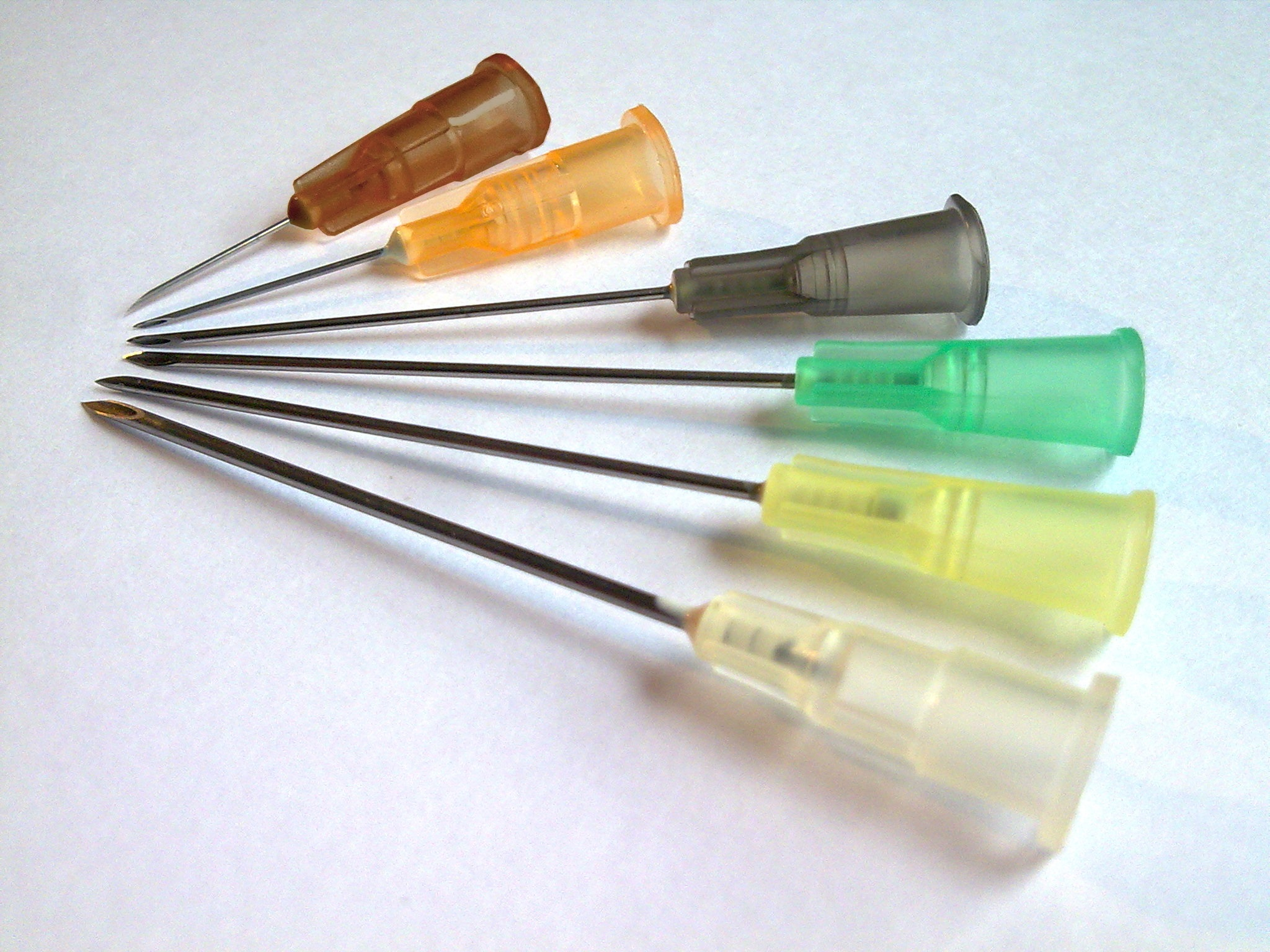
Six hypodermic needles on Luer connectors. These needles are normally used with other medical devices, such as a syringe; from top to bottom: 26G × 1/2″ (0.45 × 12 mm) (brown); 25G × 5/8″ (0.5 × 16 mm) (orange); 22G × 1 1/4″ (0.7 × 30 mm) (black); 21G × 1 1/2″ (0.8 × 40 mm) (green); 20G × 1 1/2″ (0.9 × 40 mm) (yellow); 19G × 1 1/2″ (1.1 × 40 mm) (cream); See also Birmingham gauge.

The main system for measuring the diameter of a hypodermic needle is the Birmingham gauge (also known as the Stubs Iron Wire Gauge); the French gauge is used mainly for catheters. Various needle lengths are available for any given gauge. Needles in common medical use range from 7 gauge (the largest) to 34 (the smallest). 21-gauge needles are most commonly used for drawing blood for testing purposes, and 16- or 17-gauge needles are most commonly used for blood donation, as the larger luminal cross-sectional area results in lower fluid shear, reducing harm to red blood cells while also allowing more blood to be collected in a shorter time.

Although reusable needles remain useful for some scientific applications, disposable needles are far more common in medicine. Disposable needles are embedded in a plastic or aluminium hub that attaches to the syringe barrel by means of a press-fit or twist-on fitting. These are sometimes referred to as "Luer Lock" connections, referring to the trademark Luer-Lok. The male and female luer lock and hub—produced by pharmaceutical equipment manufacturers—are two of the most critical parts of disposable hypodermic needles.

== Use by non-specialists ==
Hypodermic needles are usually used by medical professionals (dentists, phlebotomists, physicians, pharmacists, nurses, paramedics), but they are sometimes used by patients themselves. This is most common with type one diabetics, who may require several insulin injections a day. It also occurs with patients who have asthma or other severe allergies. Such patients may need to take desensitization injections or they may need to carry injectable medicines to use for first aid in case of a severe allergic reaction. In the latter case, such patients often carry a syringe loaded with epinephrine (e.g. EpiPen), diphenhydramine (e.g. Benadryl), or dexamethasone. Rapid injection of one of these drugs may stop a severe allergic reaction.

Multiple sclerosis patients may also treat themselves by injection; several MS therapies, including various interferon preparations, are designed to be self-administered by subcutaneous or intramuscular injection.

Some recreational drugs, such as heroin, are commonly self-administered by injection.

Hypodermic needles are also used for erotic piercing.

== Phobia ==
It is estimated that anywhere from nearly 3.5 to 10% of the world's population may have a phobia of needles (trypanophobia), and it is much more common in children, ages 5–17. Topical anesthetics can be used to desensitize the area where the injection will take place to reduce pain and discomfort. For children, various techniques may be effective at reducing distress or pain related to needles. Techniques include: distraction, hypnosis, combined cognitive behavioral therapy, and breathing techniques.
