= Letitia Mumford Geer =

Nurse who designed the modern syringe (1852–1935)

- Born: 1852; New York City
- Died: July 18, 1935 (age 83); Brooklyn, New York
- Occupation: Nurse
- Known for: One-handed medical syringe

Letitia Mumford Geer (1852 – July 18, 1935) was an American nurse, inventor, and medical instrument manufacturer best known for creating the first practical one-handed medical syringe. Her 1899 patented design significantly improved the accuracy, sanitation, and efficiency of administering medications and influenced the development of modern syringes used in healthcare today. She later founded the Geer Manufacturing Company and contributed additional innovations to medical instrumentation, marking her as one of the earliest recognized women inventors in the field.

== Early life ==
Letitia Geer was born in 1852 in New York City to George Warren Geer and Cornelia Matilda Mumford Geer and was one of four children. While little is documented about her youth, she initially worked as a teacher before entering the nursing profession. Her clinical experiences exposed her to the limitations of medical tools of the era, particularly syringes, sparking her interest in improving medical technologies through practical, user-centered design.

== Career ==
After spending several years teaching, Geer moved to Chicago, where she met her husband, Charles Geer, a businessman involved in the manufacture of surgical instruments. Through her work alongside him, she became increasingly familiar with the design and function of medical devices used in hospitals and clinics. Geer observed that many of the syringes commonly in use were cumbersome, required two hands to operate, and were prone to imprecision and sanitation issues. These limitations posed challenges for nurses and physicians, especially in clinical environments that demanded speed, accuracy, and sterility.

Motivated to create a safer and more efficient tool, Geer designed a syringe that could be operated entirely with one hand, improving both control and cleanliness. She filed a patent application for the device on February 12, 1896. Her invention, which incorporated a looped finger grip attached to the plunger, enabled users to stabilize the barrel while delivering medication smoothly with a single motion. The U.S. Patent Office granted her patent in 1899 under publication number US622848A. Although her design represented a notable improvement over existing syringes, some hospitals continued to use other devices, and several companies soon manufactured syringes that closely resembled her patented model.

In 1904, Geer established the Geer Manufacturing Company to produce and refine her syringe and to continue developing medical instruments. Beyond her syringe innovation, she patented improvements to the nasal speculum and a surgical retractor, both designed with the same emphasis on usability and precision. Her one-handed syringe influenced the evolution of modern syringe design and is widely recognized as a precursor to many contemporary medical injectors. Outside of her work in medical technology, Geer was active in the women’s suffrage movement and participated in the National American Woman Suffrage Association, reflecting her broader commitment to social progress and women’s rights.

== Design breakdown ==
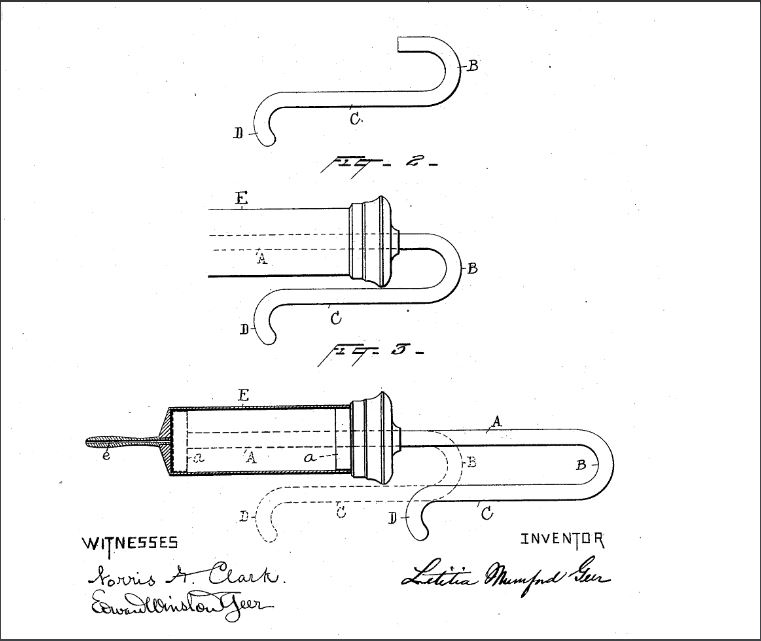
Greer's patent for a one-handed enema syringe

According to Geer's patent it was "designed for rectal and similar purposes, and has for its object to provide a handle of peculiar and novel, construction to enable a person to use the same in injecting fluid into his own rectum without the aid of an assistant" "In a hand-syringe the combination of a cylinder, a piston and an operating-rod which is bent upon itself to form a smooth and rigid arm terminating in a handle, which, in its extreme positions, is located within reach of the fingers of the hand which holds the cylinder, thus permitting one hand to hold and operate the syringe..."

Her syringe design had a detachable needle, a rubber plunger, and a cylindrical glass barrel. The rubber plunger could draw fluids into the syringe. Additionally, the plunger had a U-shaped handle.

== Death ==
Letitia Geer died on July 18, 1935, in Brooklyn, New York, at the age of 83.

== Legacy ==
In 1852, Letitia Geer was born to parents George Warren Geer and Cornelia Matilda Mumford. Greer spent her childhood and adolescence in New York City. Letitia was one of George and Cornelia’s four children. As an adult, Geer worked as a teacher, and she later became a nurse. There is not much known about Geer’s personal life or education. She met her husband when she moved to Chicago in her adulthood. It is believed that Letitia’s husband Charles was a businessman who worked in the manufacturing of surgical instruments.

On February 12th, 1896, Geer filed a patent to the US Patent and Trademark office for a one-handed medical syringe. With the aid of her husband’s business connections, she founded the Geer Manufacturing Company in 1904 to develop her inventions.

Geer’s syringe had several key features, such as a glass barrel, a rubber plunger, a piston mechanism, and a detachable needle. Making the plunger out of rubber created an air-tight vacuum inside the barrel. The glass barrel was see-through and therefore allowed the user to measure precisely the liquid inside the syringe. The needle could be taken out of the syringe, cleaned thoroughly, and replaced to ensure that the medical device was safe and not spreading bacteria. The most innovative part of Geer’s design was that the syringe could be used with only one hand. The piston mechanism was connected to a hook that the injector uses as a handle. Because the design ensures that the injector's hand remains in controlled precision, it is easy to use the syringe even when your hand is in an awkward position. This was revolutionary because it meant that someone could use the syringe of their own body. Additionally, the patent’s simple design was cost-effective and attractive to manufacturing.

Geer’s innovation caught on, and medical personnel worldwide started implementing her design. She played a role in designing the modern syringe that we use today. The key features of Geer’s syringe helped inspire the design of newer syringe models. Today, medical professionals generally use a single-use plastic syringe that was developed by Colin Albert Murdoch. His design is an iteration of Geer’s original design, but his has fallen into favor as it is more sterile to use each needle once.

Despite her extraordinary influence in the medical field and her design improving the safety of medical procedures, very little is known about Geer’s personal life. However, it is believed that she spent some of her adulthood in Chicago before returning to New York City. There is no documentation of whether she had any children or of details of her marriage to her husband, Charles. Geer was also believed to be a part of the National American Suffrage Association, where she fought for greater women’s rights. In 1935, she died at age 83. She died in New York City, the very same city in which she was born.
