= Thomas Brown (minister and natural historian) =

Scottish minister and natural historian

Thomas Brown FRSE (1811–1893) was a Scottish minister in the Free Church of Scotland who rose to its highest rank, Moderator of the General Assembly in 1890. He was a noted geologist and botanist. He wrote prolifically on the history of the Disruption of 1843.

== Life ==
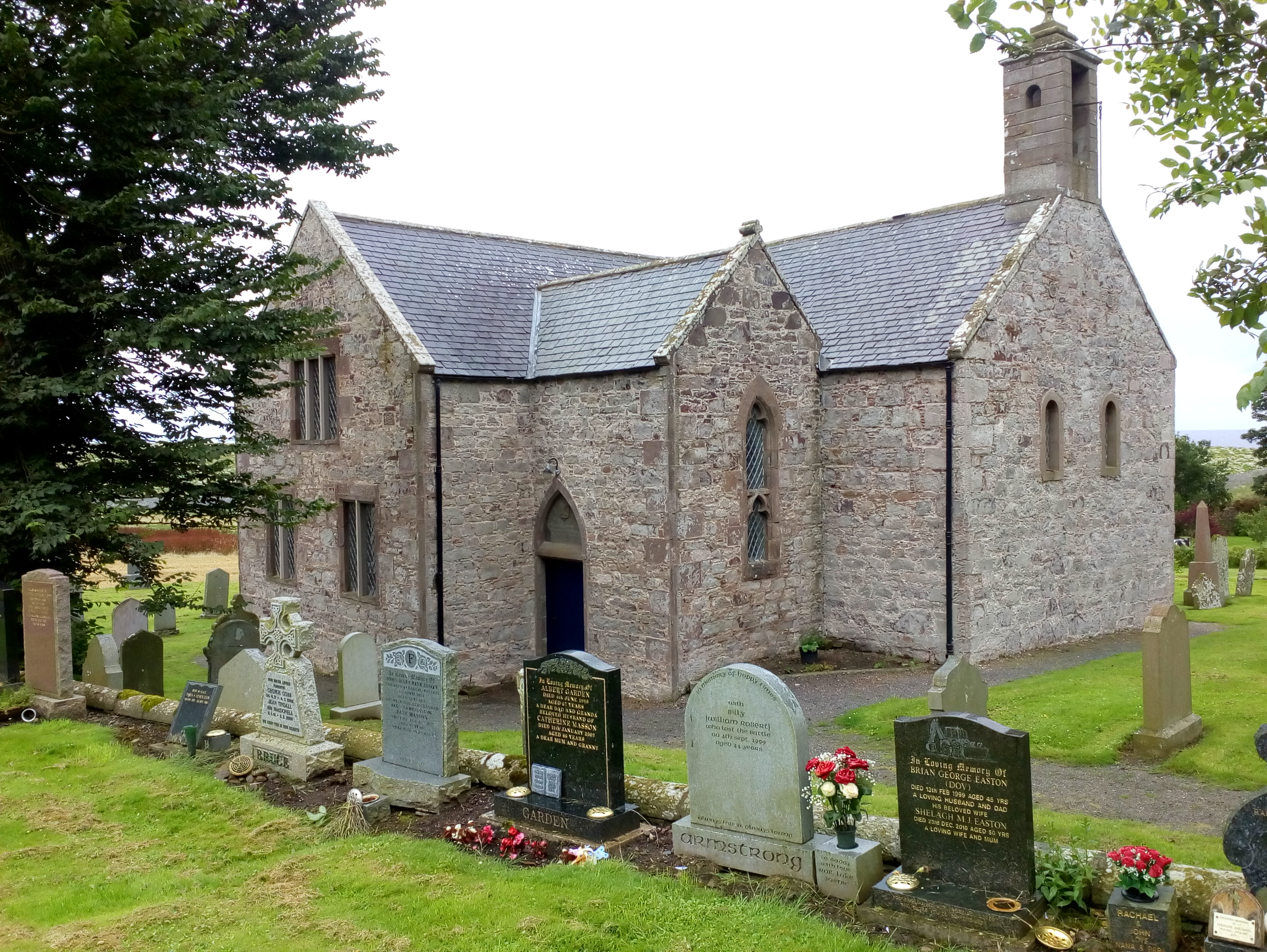
Kinneff Old Kirk

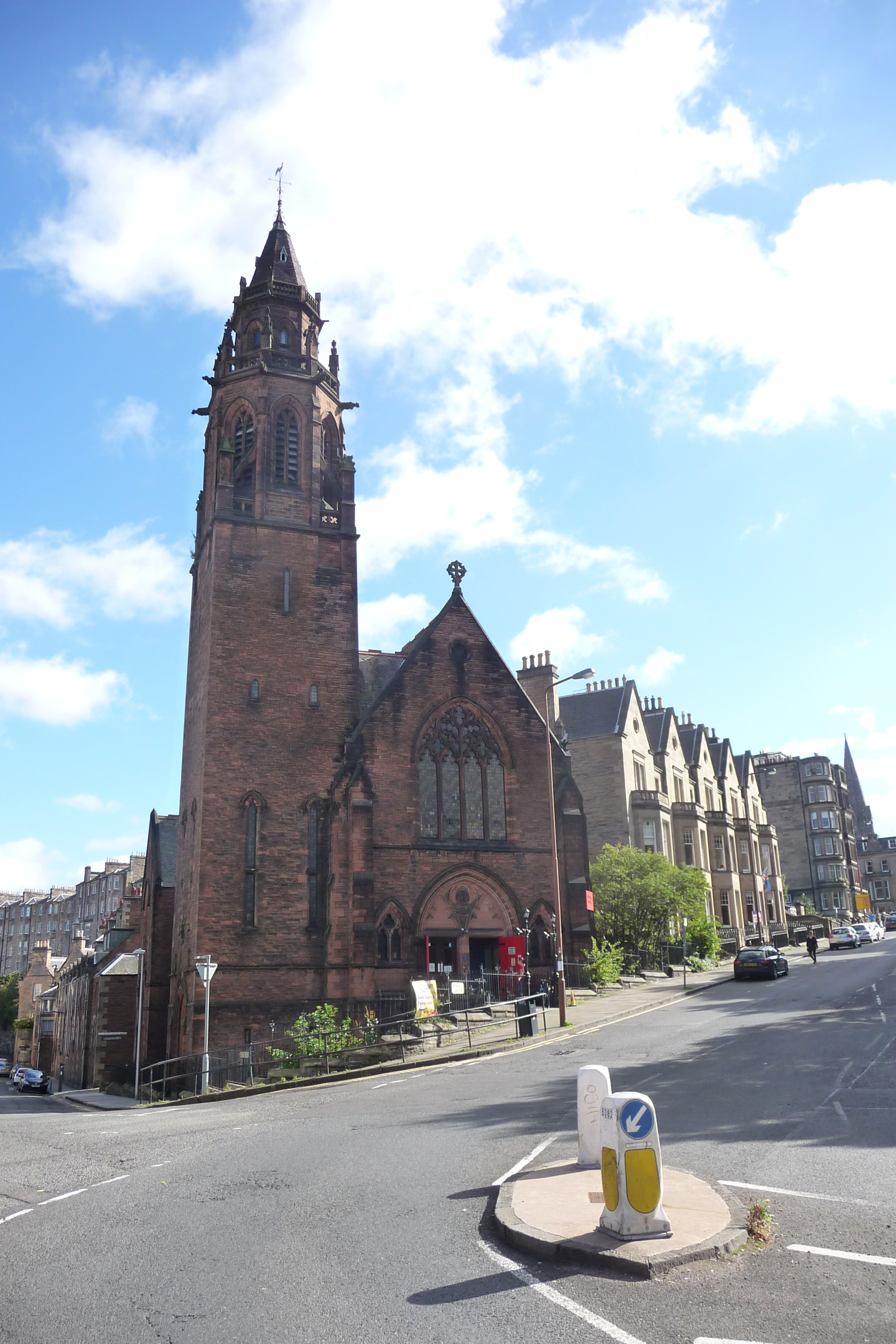
Dean Free Church

He was born on 23 April 1811 in the manse at Langton, Berwickshire in south-east Scotland, the son of John Brown, minister of that parish.

He trained in theology at Edinburgh University and began working as a minister in 1837 at Kinneff in Aberdeenshire. He left the Church of Scotland at the point of the Disruption of 1843. He spent some years without a ministry before being placed in the relatively prestigious Dean Free Church on Belford Road in north-west Edinburgh in 1849. He remained in the Free Church of Scotland for the rest of his life, serving as its Moderator for 1890/91 and the age of 79 in succession to Rev John Laird.

He was elected a Fellow of the Royal Society of Edinburgh in 1861. His address was then listed as 16 Carlton Street in Stockbridge, Edinburgh.

Edinburgh University honoured him with a Doctor of Divinity in 1880.

He died at home, 16 Carlton Street in Edinburgh on 4 April 1893.

== Family ==
He married 27 April 1848, Marianne (born 30 November 1814, died 9 December 1856 and whose brother was Alexander Wood), daughter of James Wood, M.D., Edinburgh, and Mary Wood of Grangehill, and had issue —

- John James Graham, M.D., President, Royal College of Physicians, Edinburgh, Lecturer on Neurology in University of Edinburgh, born 6 September 1853; died 1925
- Mary Eleanor Lucy, died in infancy
- James Wood, M.A., minister of the Free Church, Gordon, Berwickshire, author of Covenanters of the Merse, and other works, born 2 December 1856, died at Florence 16 March 1914.

== Publications ==
See

- Botany of Langton – part of the New Statistical Account of Scotland, 1834
- A Sketch of the Life and Work of Alexander Wood MD FRCP (1886)
- Commentary on the Gospels (1854)
- Church and State in Scotland, 1560 to 1843 (1891)
- Annals of the Disruption (1893)
- A History of Berwickshire Natuaralists' Club (proceedings of the Royal Society of Edinburgh, 1893)
- Annals of the Disruption (Edinburgh, 1876, 1884, 1893)
- Church and State in Scotland from 1560 to 1843 [Chalmers Lecture] (Edinburgh, 1891)
- "The Game of Ball as played in Dunse on Fastern's Eve" (A History of Berwickshire Natuaralists' Club, vol. i., 44–6)
- "Notes on the Mountain Limestone and Lower Carboniferous Rocks of the Fifeshire Coast, from Burntisland to St Andrews" (Trans. Roy. Soc. Edin., vol. xxii.)
- "On a Clay Deposit . . . recently observed in the Basin of the Forth" (Trans. Roy. Soc. Edin.)
- "Notice of Glacial Clay near Errol"
- "On the Parallel Roads of Glenroy "
- " On the Old River Terraces of the Earn and Teith" (Trans. Roy. Soc. Edin., xxvi.)
- "Address to Berwickshire Nat. Club, 12th Oct. 1881 " (A History of Berwickshire Natuaralists' Club, ix., 415–24)
- Account of the Parish (New Statistical Account, xi.)

== Bibliography ==
- Obituary Notice by Prof. Duns, D.D., in Hist. Berwickshire Nat. Club (1892-3), 339-46
- The Border Almanac (1894), 76–8.

== See also ==
- Works by or about Thomas Brown at the Internet Archive
