= Luers =

Luers is a surname, mostly found in the United States. Notable people with the surname include:

- Jeff Luers (born 1951), American political activist
- John Luers (1819–1871), American Roman Catholic Church bishop
- Renee Luers-Gillispie, American college softball player and coach
- Wendy Luers, American political activist
- William Luers (1929–2025), American diplomat and museum executive

== See also ==
- Luer, people with this surname
- Charles Luers Nordsiek (1896–1937), an American seaman in the United States Navy
- Bishop Luers High School, a Roman Catholic school in Fort Wayne, Indiana
