= Charles Hunter (physician) =

English physician (1835–1878)

Charles Hunter MRCS LSA
- Born: 1835; London, England
- Died: 8 August 1878 (aged 42–43); Hastings, England
- Known for: Coining the term "hypodermic" and arguing that injected narcotics had a generalised effect.
- Medical career
- Profession: Medical doctor
- Institutions: St George's Hospital; Royal Pimlico Dispensary
- Notable works: On the hypodermic administration of remedies in neuralgia and other affections; On the speedy relief of pain and other nervous affections, by means of the hypodermic method

Charles Hunter MRCS LSA (1835 – 8 August 1878) was an English physician best known for coining the word "hypodermic" and for realising that injections of morphine could relieve pain anywhere in the body, regardless of where the injection was delivered.

== Life ==
Charles Hunter was the only son of surgeon Dr John Charles Hunter of Belgrave Square, London. Hunter qualified as a Member of the Royal College of Surgeons in 1856. He then became House Surgeon at St George's Hospital in London and also worked at the Royal Pimlico Dispensary.

== Hypodermic research and debate over injection methods ==
Hunter was very early in his career when he became interested in using syringes to administer injections of pain relief. In the 1860s, he improved on the design of the syringe that had been invented by Alexander Wood by adding the needle point and lateral opening. He also created a locking mechanism to prevent the needle from becoming detached when the plunger was pushed.

Hunter initially followed Wood's method of using syringes to inject morphine locally, into the area where pain was located. However, when this area became infected for one of his patients, he injected elsewhere and realised that the results were still effective. After conducting tests on animals to establish his findings, Hunter campaigned for the "general therapeutic effect" of what he initially called the "ipodermic" method, later inventing the term "hypodermic". He published his findings in 1865, and popularised the use of the syringe in medical circles by speaking at medical society meetings and publishing papers on the subject of hypodermics.

Hunter and Wood then entered into a debate about whose theory was correct. Wood wrote to the Medical Times and Gazette both challenging Hunter's idea that injected drugs could work across the body and also emphasising that he had been the first to look into the effects of injecting. Hunter replied, saying that he had cited Wood and never claimed to have been first, and that his belief in the generalised effect of injected narcotics was correct rather than Wood's belief that morphine only worked locally.

By 1867, the Medical and Chirurgical Society of London appointed a committee to investigate whether injections were best delivered subcutaneously in the area of pain (as Wood insisted), or elsewhere to systemically deliver relief (as Hunter claimed). They emphatically supported Hunter. Francis E. Anstie also recommended Hunter's method, proclaiming that there was absolutely no danger in administering opium hypodermic injection.

== Death and legacy ==
Hunter died on 8 August 1878 in a Hastings vicarage after two months of illness, at the age of 43. His early death and Wood's popularity meant that Hunter's legacy in the history of medicine has not endured particularly well by comparison.

Hunter's archive is held at the Wellcome Library in London, with shelfmark MS.6892.
