= Syringe =

Medical injection device

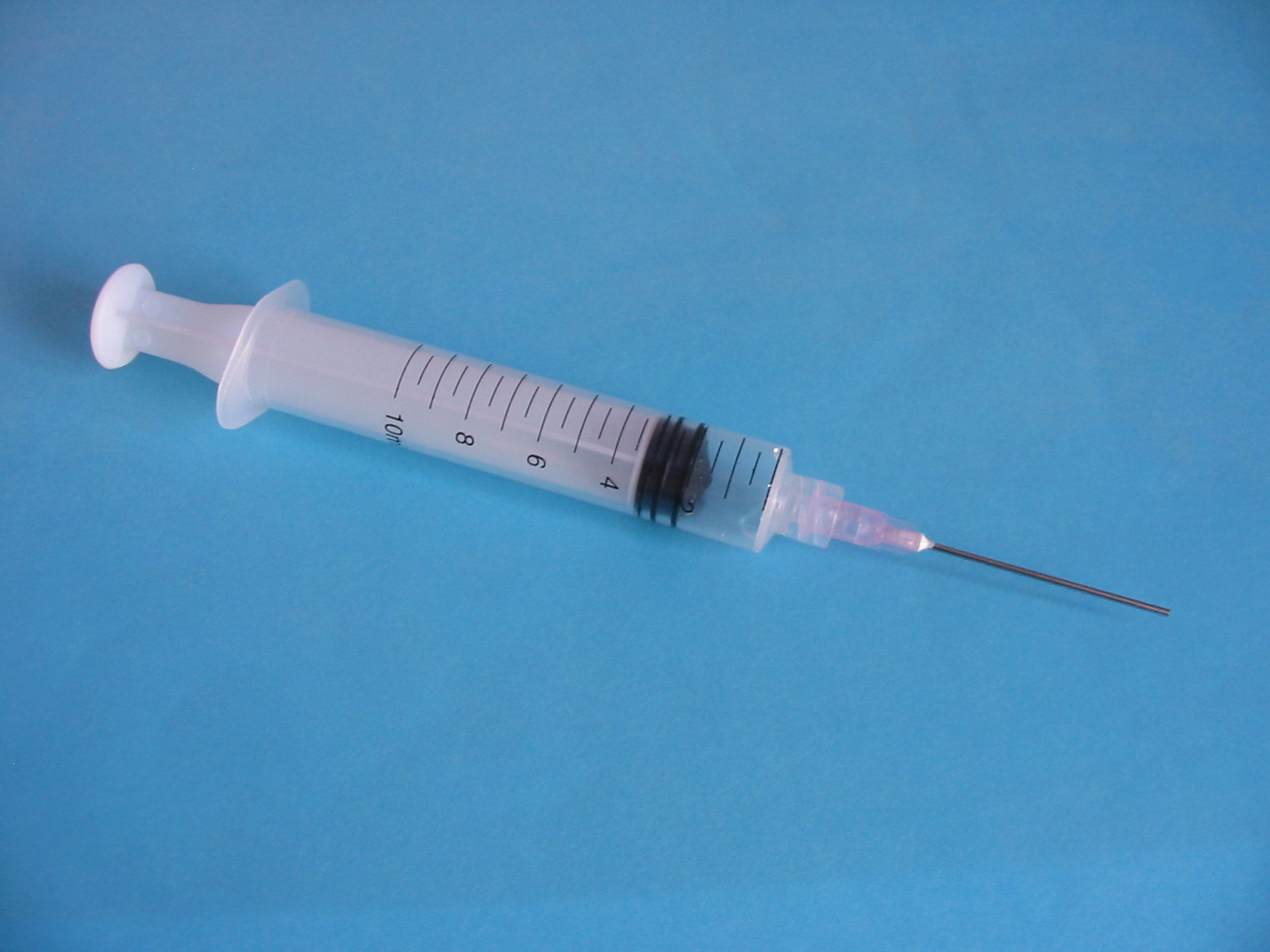
- A typical plastic medical syringe fitted with a detachable stainless steel needle; the syringe is fitted with a male Luer lock fitting which the needle, which is equipped with a female Luer-Lock fitting (purple), screws into
- Classification: Medical device
- Industry: Healthcare
- Application: Injection
- Inventor: Letitia Mumford Geer,Charles Pravaz (screw); Alexander Wood (plunger)
- Invented: 1853 (173 years ago)

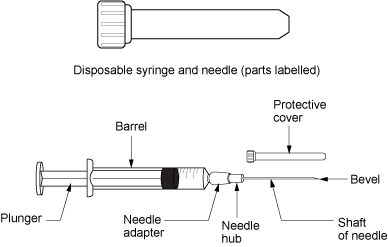
Disposable syringe with needle, with parts labelled: plunger, barrel, needle adaptor, needle hub, needle bevel, needle shaft

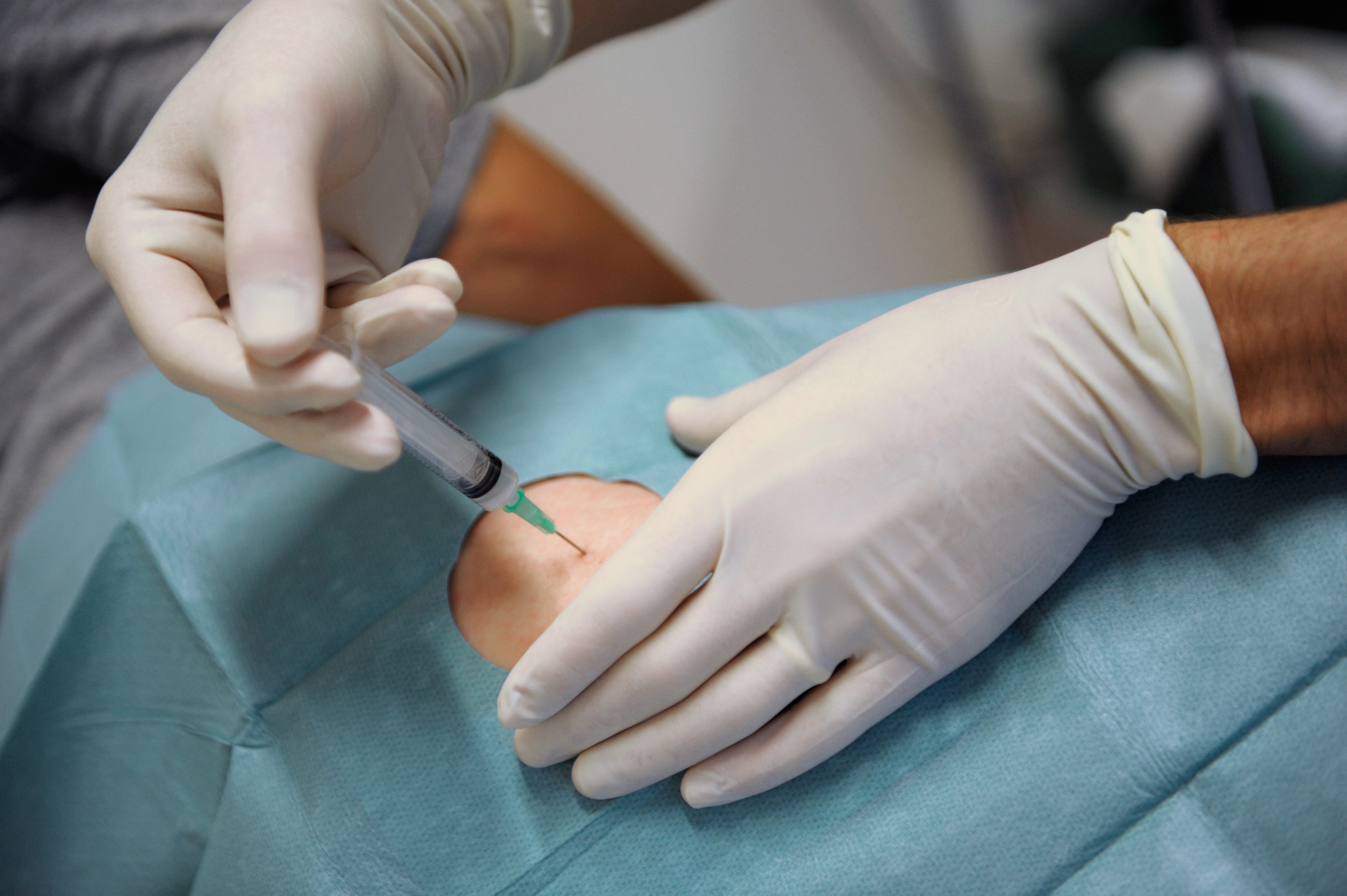
According to the World Health Organization, about 90% of the medical syringes are used to administer drugs, 5% for vaccinations and 5% for other uses such as blood transfusions.

A syringe is a simple reciprocating pump consisting of a plunger (though in modern syringes, it is actually a piston) that fits tightly within a cylindrical tube called a barrel. The plunger can be linearly pulled and pushed along the inside of the tube, allowing the syringe to take in and expel liquid or gas through a discharge orifice at the front (open) end of the tube. The open end of the syringe may be fitted with a hypodermic needle, a nozzle or tubing to direct the flow into and out of the barrel. Syringes are frequently used in clinical medicine to administer injections, infuse intravenous therapy into the bloodstream, apply compounds such as glue or lubricant, and draw/measure liquids. There are also prefilled syringes (disposable syringes marketed with liquid inside).

The word "syringe" is derived from the Greek σῦριγξ (syrinx, meaning "Pan flute", "tube").

== Medical syringes ==
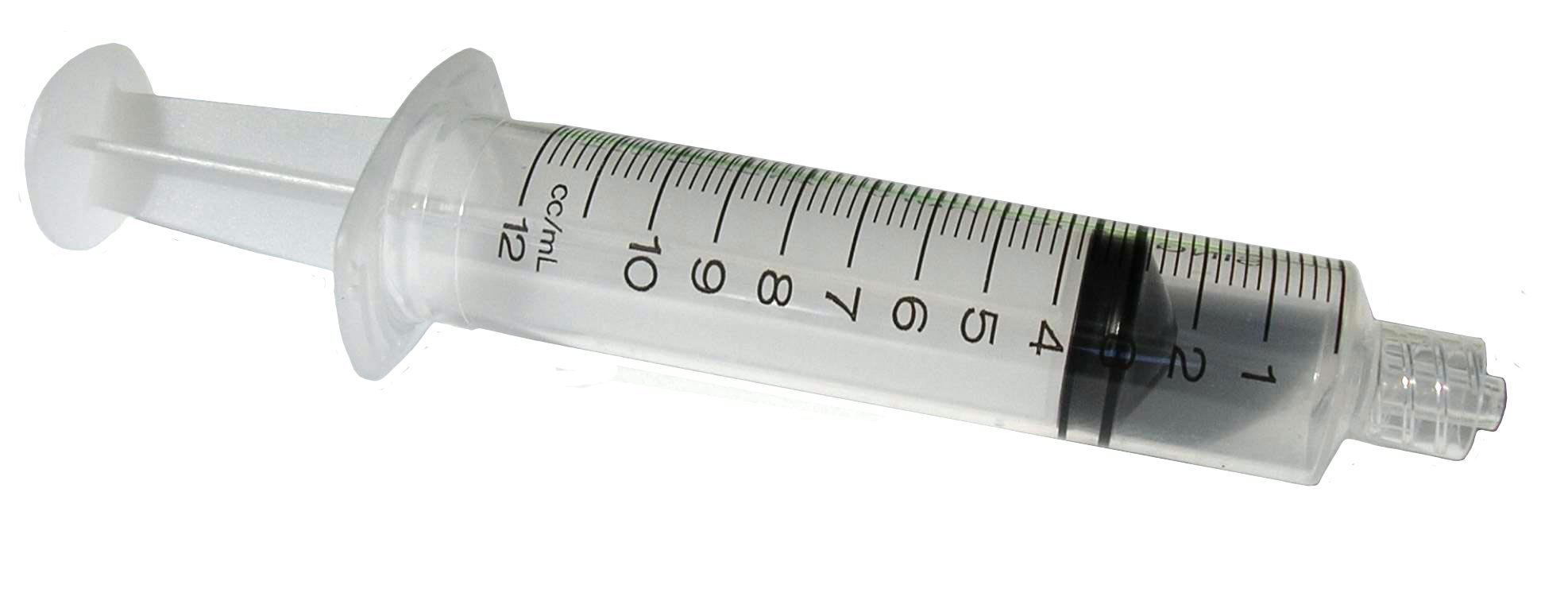
The threads of the Luer lock tip of this 12mL disposable syringe keep it securely connected to a tube or other apparatus.

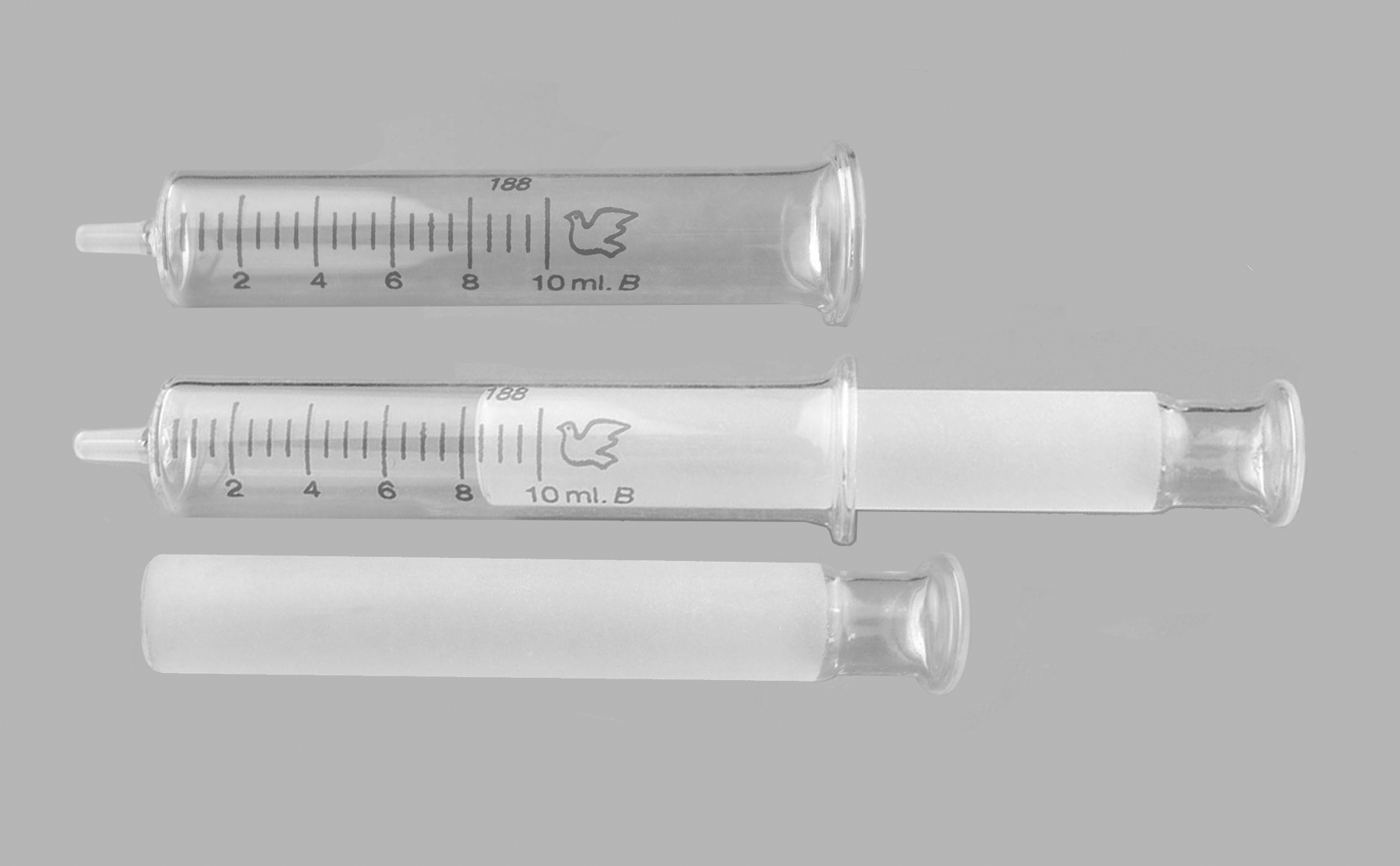
Syringe made entirely of glass, with no parts made from plastic nor any other material

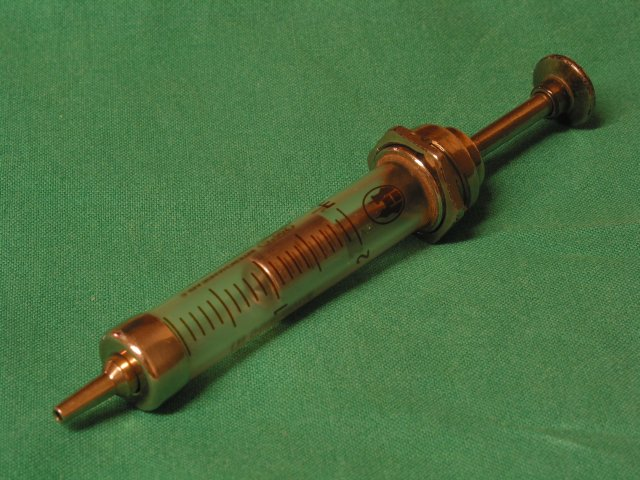
An antique glass and metal syringe

Medical syringes include disposable and safety syringes, injection pens, needleless injectors, insulin pumps, and specialty needles. Hypodermic syringes are used with hypodermic needles to inject liquid or gases into body tissues, or to remove from the body. Injecting of air into a blood vessel is hazardous, as it may cause an air embolism; preventing embolisms by removing air from the syringe is one of the reasons for the familiar image of holding a hypodermic syringe pointing upward, tapping it, and expelling a small amount of liquid before an injection into the bloodstream.

The barrel of a syringe is made of plastic or glass, usually has graduated marks indicating the volume of fluid in the syringe, and is nearly always transparent. Glass syringes may be sterilized in an autoclave. Plastic syringes can be constructed as either two-part or three-part designs. A three-part syringe contains a plastic plunger/piston with a rubber tip to create a seal between the piston and the barrel, where a two-part syringe is manufactured to create a perfect fit between the plastic plunger and the barrel to create the seal without the need for a separate synthetic rubber piston. Two-part syringes have been traditionally used in European countries to prevent introduction of additional materials such as silicone oil needed for lubricating three-part plungers. Most modern medical syringes are plastic because they are cheap enough to dispose of after being used only once, reducing the risk of spreading blood-borne diseases. Reuse of needles and syringes has caused spread of diseases, especially HIV and hepatitis, among intravenous drug users. Syringes are also commonly reused by diabetics, as they can go through several in a day with multiple daily insulin injections, which becomes an affordability issue for many. Even though the syringe and needle are only used by a single person, this practice is still unsafe as it can introduce bacteria from the skin into the bloodstream and cause serious and sometimes lethal infections. In medical settings, single-use needles and syringes effectively reduce the risk of cross-contamination.

Medical syringes are sometimes used without a needle for orally administering liquid medicines to young children or animals, or milk to small young animals, because the dose can be measured accurately and it is easier to squirt the medicine into the subject's mouth instead of coaxing the subject to drink out of a measuring spoon.

=== Tip designs ===
Syringes come with a number of designs for the area in which the blade locks to the syringe body. Perhaps the most well known of these is the Luer lock, which simply twists the two together.

Bodies featuring a small, plain connection are known as slip tips and are useful for when the syringe is being connected to something not featuring a screw lock mechanism.

Similar to this is the catheter tip, which is essentially a slip tip but longer and tapered, making it good for pushing into things where there the plastic taper can form a tight seal. These can also be used for rinsing out wounds or large abscesses in veterinary use.

There is also an eccentric tip, where the nozzle at the end of the syringe is not in the centre of the syringe but at the side. This causes the blade attached to the syringe to lie almost in line with the walls of the syringe itself and they are used when the blade needs to get very close to parallel with the skin (when injecting into a surface vein or artery for example).

=== Standard U-100 insulin syringes ===
Insulin syringes are marked in insulin "units".

Syringes for insulin users are designed for standard U-100 insulin. The dilution of insulin is such that 1 mL of insulin fluid has 100 standard "units" of insulin. A typical insulin vial may contain 10 mL, for 1000 units.

Insulin syringes are made specifically for a patient to inject themselves, and have features to assist this purpose when compared to a syringe for use by a healthcare professional:

- shorter needles, as insulin injections are subcutaneous (under the skin) rather than intramuscular,
- finer gauge needles, for less pain,
- markings in insulin units to simplify drawing a measured dose of insulin, and
- low dead space to reduce complications caused by improper drawing order of different insulin strengths.

U-100 syringe sizes and markings
1cc (1 mL) Syringe
Holds maximum:	100 units
Numbered in:	10 unit increments
Smallest line measures 2 units:	BD ReliOn Monoject (all but 31 gauge needle)
Smallest line measures 1 unit:	Easy Touch Precision Sure Dose
1/2cc (0.5 mL) Syringe
Holds maximum:	50 units
Numbered in:	10 unit increments
Smallest line measures 1 unit:	BD Precision Sure Dose Ulti-Care Easy Touch ReliOn Monoject
3/10cc (0.3 mL) Syringe
Holds maximum:	30 units
Numbered in:	5 unit increments
Smallest line measures 1 unit:	BD Micro Fine BD Ultra Fine (standard length only) Monoject Easy Touch UltiCare
Half-unit scale 3/10cc (0.3 mL) Syringe
Holds maximum:	30 units
Numbered in:	5 unit increments
Smallest line measures 1/2 unit:	BD Ultra Fine II (short) ReliOn

=== Multishot needle syringes ===
There are needle syringes designed to reload from a built-in tank (container) after each injection, so they can make several or many injections on a filling. These are not used much in human medicine because of the risk of cross-infection via the needle. An exception is the personal insulin autoinjector used by diabetic patients and in dual-chambered syringe designs intended to deliver a prefilled saline flush solution after the medication.

=== Venom extraction syringes ===
Venom extraction syringes are different from standard syringes, because they usually do not puncture the wound. The most common types have a plastic nozzle which is placed over the affected area, and then the syringe piston is pulled back, creating a vacuum that allegedly sucks out the venom. Attempts to treat snakebites in this way are specifically advised against, as they are ineffective and can cause additional injury.

Syringes of this type are sometimes used for extracting human botfly larvae from the skin.

=== Oral syringes ===
An oral syringe is a measuring instrument used to accurately measure doses of liquid medication, expressed in millilitres (mL). They do not have threaded tips, because no needle or other device needs to be screwed onto them. The contents are simply squirted or sucked from the syringe directly into the mouth of the person or animal.

Oral syringes are available in various sizes, from 1–10 mL and larger. An oral syringe is typically purple in colour to distinguish it from a standard injection syringe with a luer tip. The sizes most commonly used are 1 mL, 2.5 mL, 3 mL, 5 mL and 10 mL.

=== Dental syringes ===
A dental syringe is used by dentists for the injection of an anesthetic. It consists of a breech-loading syringe fitted with a sealed cartridge containing an anesthetic solution.

In 1928, Bayer Dental developed, coined and produced a sealed cartridge system under the registered trademark Carpule^{®}. The current trademark owner is Kulzer Dental GmbH.

The carpules have long been reserved for anesthetic products for dental use. It is practically a bottomless flask. The latter is replaced by an elastomer plug that can slide in the body of the cartridge. This plug will be pushed by the plunger of the syringe. The neck is closed with a rubber cap. The dentist places the cartridge directly into a stainless steel syringe, with a double-pointed (single-use) needle. The tip placed on the cartridge side punctures the capsule and the piston will push the product. There is therefore no contact between the product and the ambient air during use.

The ancillary tool (generally part of a dental engine) used to supply water, compressed air or mist (formed by combination of water and compressed air) to the oral cavity for the purpose of irrigation (cleaning debris away from the area the dentist is working on), is also referred to as a dental syringe or a dental irrigation nozzle.

A 3-way syringe/nozzle has separate internal channels supplying air, water or a mist created by combining the pressurized air with the waterflow. The syringe tip can be separated from the main body and replaced when necessary.

In the UK and Ireland, manually operated hand syringes are used to inject lidocaine into patients' gums.

=== Dose-sparing syringes ===
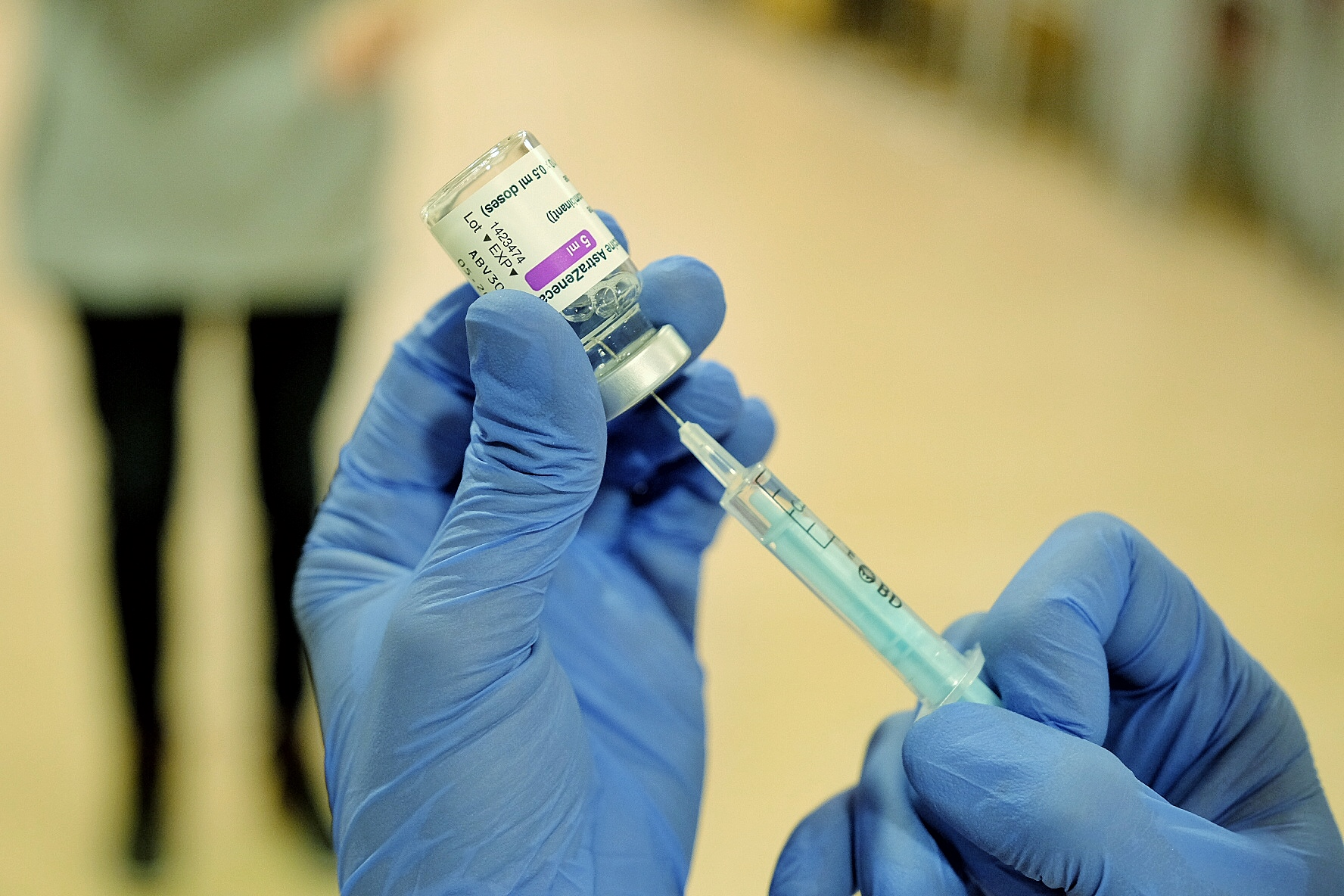
A dose-sparing syringe and needle being used to draw up a COVID-19 vaccine

A dose-sparing syringe is one which minimises the amount of liquid remaining in the barrel after the plunger has been depressed. These syringes feature a combined needle and syringe, and a protrusion on the face of the plunger to expel liquid from the needle hub. Such syringes were particularly popular during the COVID-19 pandemic as vaccines were in short supply.

=== Regulation ===
In some jurisdictions, the sale or possession of hypodermic syringes may be controlled or prohibited without a prescription, due to its potential use with illegal intravenous drugs.

== Non-medical uses ==
The syringe has many non-medical applications.

=== Laboratory applications ===
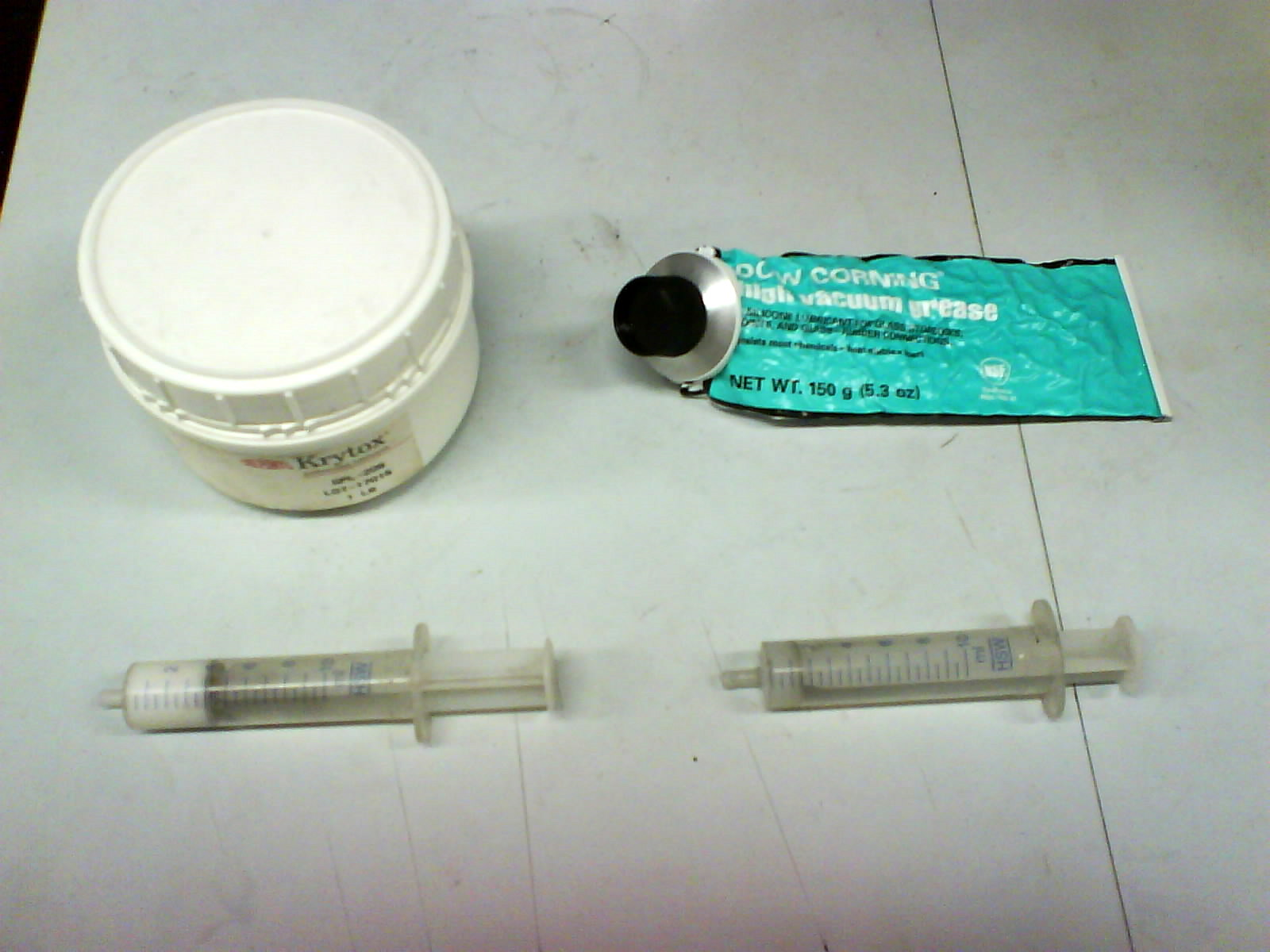
Laboratory grease, commonly used to lubricate ground glass joints and stopcocks, is sometimes loaded in syringes for easy application.

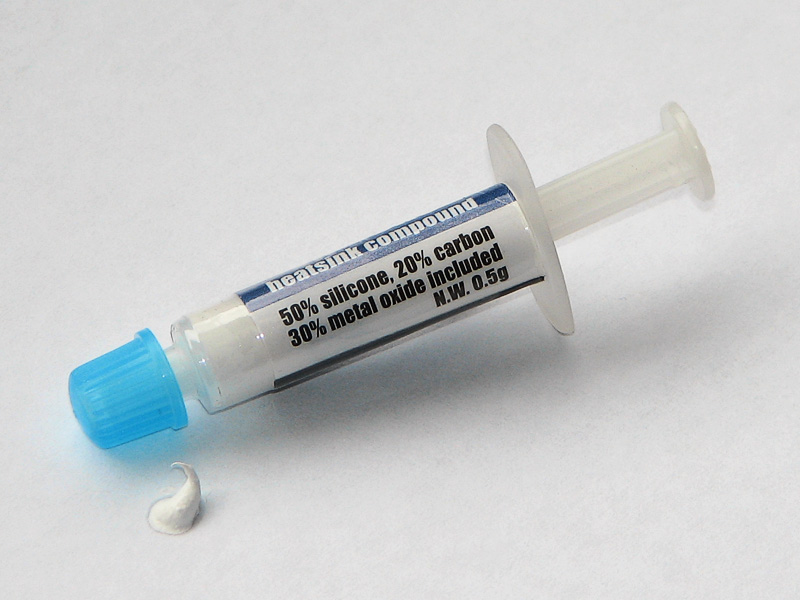
Some chemical compounds, such as thermal paste and various glues, e.g. epoxy, are sold in prepackaged syringes.

Medical-grade disposable hypodermic syringes are often used in research laboratories for convenience and low cost. Another application is to use the needle tip to add liquids to very confined spaces, such as washing out some scientific apparatus. They are often used for measuring and transferring solvents and reagents where a high precision is not required. Alternatively, microliter syringes can be used to measure and dose chemicals very precisely by using a small diameter capillary as the syringe barrel.

The polyethylene construction of these disposable syringes usually makes them rather chemically resistant. There is, however, a risk of the contents of the syringes leaching plasticizers from the syringe material. Non-disposable glass syringes may be preferred where this is a problem. Glass syringes may also be preferred where a very high degree of precision is important (i.e. quantitative chemical analysis), because their engineering tolerances are lower and the plungers move more smoothly. In these applications, the transfer of pathogens is usually not an issue.

Used with a long needle or cannula, syringes are also useful for transferring fluids through rubber septa when atmospheric oxygen or moisture are being excluded. Examples include the transfer of air-sensitive or pyrophoric reagents such as phenylmagnesium bromide and n-butyllithium respectively. Glass syringes are also used to inject small samples for gas chromatography (1 μl) and mass spectrometry (10 μl). Syringe drivers may be used with the syringe as well.

=== Cooking ===
Some culinary uses of syringes are injecting liquids (such as gravy) into other foods, or for the manufacture of some candies.

Syringes may also be used when cooking meat to enhance flavor and texture by injecting juices inside the meat, and in baking to inject filling inside a pastry. It is common for these syringes to be made of stainless steel components, including the barrel. Such facilitates easy disassembly and cleaning.

=== Others ===
Syringes are used to refill ink in fountain pens and printer ink cartridges.

Common workshop applications include injecting glue into tight spots to repair joints where disassembly is impractical or impossible; and injecting lubricants onto working surfaces without spilling.

Sometimes a large hypodermic syringe is used without a needle for very small baby mammals to suckle from in artificial rearing.

Historically, large pumps that use reciprocating motion to pump water were referred to as syringes. Pumps of this type were used as early firefighting equipment.

There are fountain syringes where the liquid is in a bag or can and goes to the nozzle via a pipe. In earlier times, clyster syringes were used for that purpose.

Loose snus is often applied using modified syringes. The nozzle is removed so the opening is the width of the chamber. The snus can be packed tightly into the chamber and plunged into the upper lip. Syringes, called portioners, are also manufactured for this particular purpose.

== Historical timeline ==
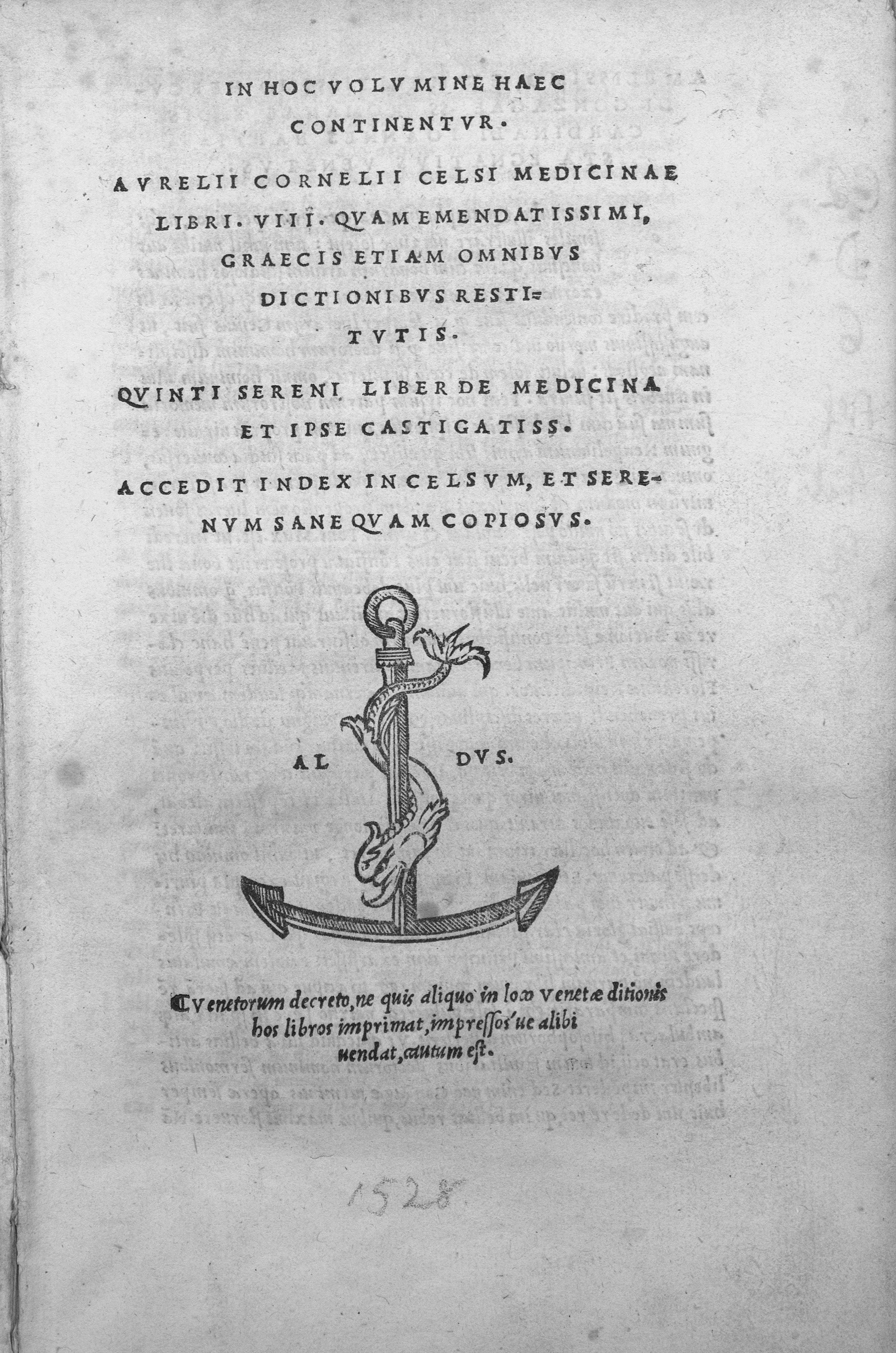
De Medicina by the Roman author Aulus Cornelius Celsus, later the first medical textbook to be printed

- Piston syringes were used in ancient times. During the 1st century AD Aulus Cornelius Celsus mentioned the use of them to treat medical complications in his De Medicina.
- 9th century: The Iraqi/Egyptian surgeon Ammar ibn 'Ali al-Mawsili' described a syringe in the 9th century using a hollow glass tube, and suction to remove cataracts from patients' eyes, a practice that remained in use until at least the 13th century.
- Pre-Columbian Native Americans created early hypodermic needles and syringes using "hollow bird bones and small animal bladders".
- 1650: Blaise Pascal invented a syringe (not necessarily hypodermic) as an application of what is now called Pascal's law.
- 1844: Irish physician Francis Rynd invented the hollow needle and used it to make the first recorded subcutaneous injections, specifically a sedative to treat neuralgia.
- 1853: Charles Pravaz and Alexander Wood independently developed medical syringes with a needle fine enough to pierce the skin. Pravaz's syringe was made of silver and used a screw mechanism to dispense fluids. Wood's syringe was made of glass, enabling its contents to be seen and measured, and used a plunger to inject them. It is effectively the syringe that is used today.
- 1865: Charles Hunter coined the term "hypodermic", and developed an improvement to the syringe that locked the needle into place so that it would not be ejected from the end of the syringe when the plunger was depressed, and published research indicating that injections of pain relief could be given anywhere in the body, not just in the area of pain, and still be effective.
- 1867: The Medical and Chirurgical Society of London investigated whether injected narcotics had a general effect (as argued by Hunter) or whether they only worked locally (as argued by Wood). After conducting animal tests and soliciting opinions from the wider medical community, they firmly sided with Hunter.
- 1894: Luer taper allows two part syringes where the needle and syringe are easily fitted together or separated.
- 1899: Letitia Mumford Geer patented a syringe which could be operated with one hand and which could be used for self-administered rectal injections.
- 1946: Chance Brothers in Smethwick, West Midlands, England, produced the first all-glass syringe with interchangeable barrel and plunger, thereby allowing mass-sterilisation of components without the need for matching them.
- 1949: Australian inventor Charles Rothauser created the world's first plastic, disposable hypodermic syringe at his Adelaide factory.
- 1951: Rothauser produced the first injection-moulded syringes made of polypropylene, a plastic that can be heat-sterilised. Millions were made for Australian and export markets.
- 1956: New Zealand pharmacist and inventor Colin Murdoch was granted New Zealand and Australian patents for a disposable plastic syringe.

== See also ==
- Fire syringe has two meanings:
  - A fire piston, a fire starting device
  - A squirt, in the form of a large syringe, one of the first firefighting devices in history used to squirt water onto the burning fuel.
- Autoinjector, a device to ease injection, e.g. by the patient or other untrained personnel.
- Hippy Sippy
- Jet injector, injects without a needle, by squirting the injection fluid so fast that it makes a hole in the skin.
- Luer taper, a standardized fitting system used for making leak-free connections between syringe tips and needles.
- Needle exchange programme, is a social policy based on the philosophy of harm reduction where injecting drug users (IDUs) can obtain hypodermic needles and associated injection equipment at little or no cost.
- Safety syringe, with features to prevent accidental needlesticks and reuse
- Syrette, similar to a syringe except that it has a closed flexible tube (like that used for toothpaste) instead of a rigid tube and piston.
- Syringing the ear to remove excess ear wax.
- Syrinx, the nymph from classical mythology after which syringes were supposedly named.
- Trypanophobia, a fairly common extreme fear of hypodermic syringes
- Vaginal syringe
