= Vectra (plastic) =

Vectra is a brand of liquid crystal polymer (LCP) manufactured by Ticona (a subsidiary of Celanese).

Physical properties of Vectra were tested in the report "Non-Metallic Transducer Mounting Brackets" by the US Naval Research Laboratory in 1992, and the resulting test data is publicly available from the external link below.

CAS: 81843-52-9 (Vectra A 910).
