= Liquid-crystal polymer =

Class of extremely unreactive, inert and fire-resistant polymers

Solid LCP
Specific Gravity	1.38 to 1.95
Elasticity modulus (E)	8530 to 17200 MPa
Tensile strength (σ_{t})	52.8 to 185 MPa
Tensile Elongation (%)	0.26 to 6.2
Notched Izod Impact	21.0 to 82.5 kJ/m^{2}

Liquid crystal polymers (LCPs) are polymers with the property of liquid crystal, usually containing aromatic rings as mesogens. Despite uncrosslinked LCPs, polymeric materials like liquid crystal elastomers (LCEs) and liquid crystal networks (LCNs) can exhibit liquid crystallinity as well. They are both crosslinked LCPs but have different cross link density. They are widely used in the digital display market. In addition, LCPs have unique properties like thermal actuation, anisotropic swelling, and soft elasticity. Therefore, they can be good actuators and sensors. One of the most famous and classical applications for LCPs is Kevlar, a strong but light fiber with wide applications, notably in bulletproof vests and high end sports gear.

== Background ==
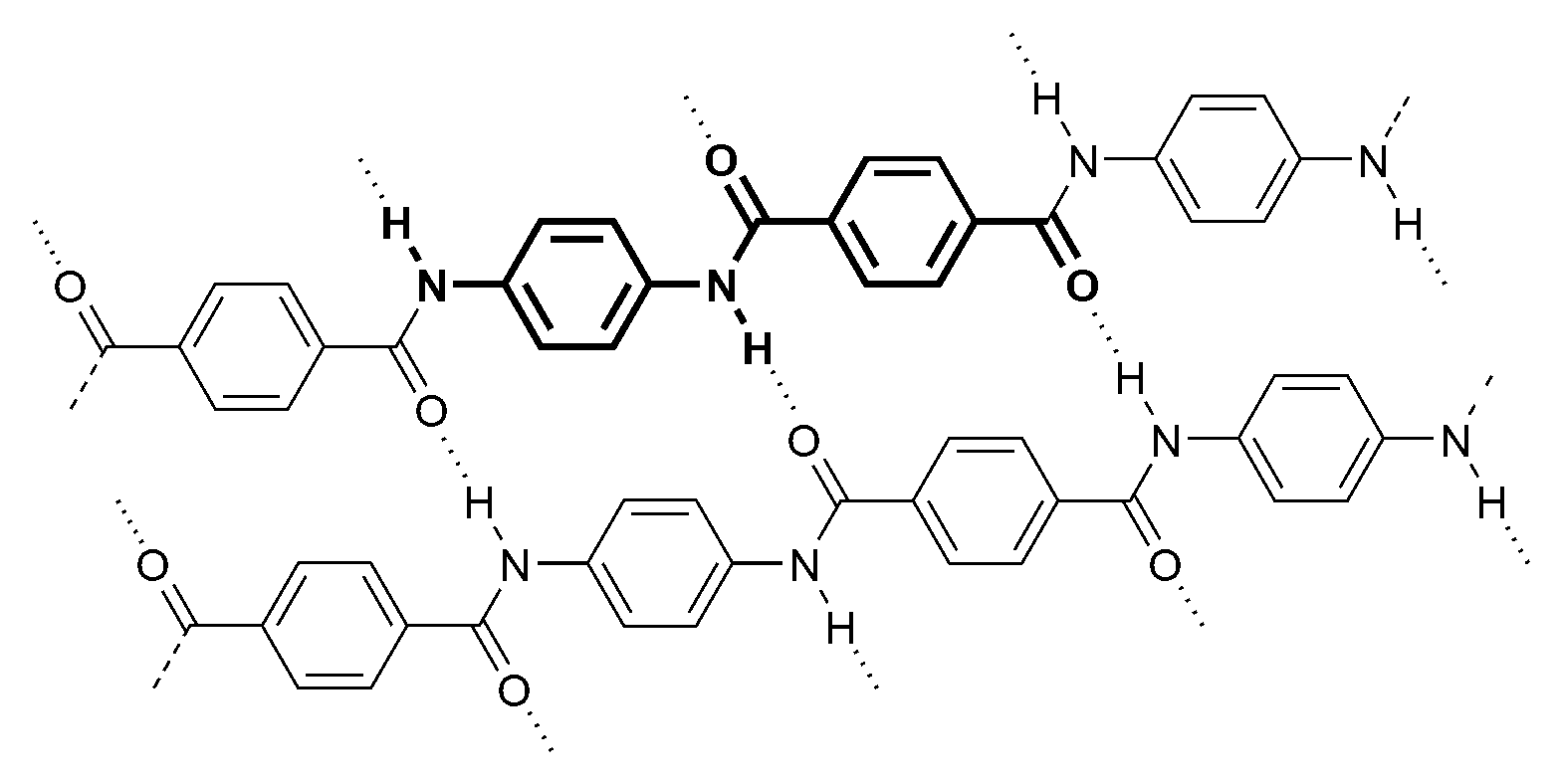
Molecular structure of Kevlar

Molecular structure of the LCP Vectran

Liquid crystallinity in polymers may occur either by dissolving a polymer in a solvent (lyotropic liquid-crystal polymers) or by heating a polymer above its glass or melting transition point (thermotropic liquid-crystal polymers). Liquid-crystal polymers are present in melted/liquid or solid form. In solid form, the main example of lyotropic LCPs is the commercial aramid known as Kevlar. The chemical structure of this aramid consists of linearly substituted aromatic rings linked by amide groups. In a similar way, several series of thermotropic LCPs have been commercially produced by several companies.

A high number of LCPs, produced in the 1980s, displayed order in the melt phase analogous to that exhibited by nonpolymeric liquid crystals. Processing of LCPs from liquid-crystal phases (or mesophases) gives rise to fibers and injected materials having high mechanical properties as a consequence of the self-reinforcing properties derived from the macromolecular orientation in the mesophase.

LCPs can be melt-processed on conventional equipment at high speeds with excellent replication of mold details. The high ease of forming of LCPs is an important competitive advantage against other plastics, as it offsets high raw material cost.

Polar and bowlic LCPs, which have unique properties and potential applications, have not been widely produced for industrial purposes.

== Mesophases ==
Same as the small molecular liquid crystal, liquid crystal polymers also have different mesophases. The mesogen cores of the polymers will aggregate into different mesophases: nematics, cholesterics, smectics and compounds with highly polar end groups. More information about the mesophases can be found on liquid crystal page.

== Classification ==
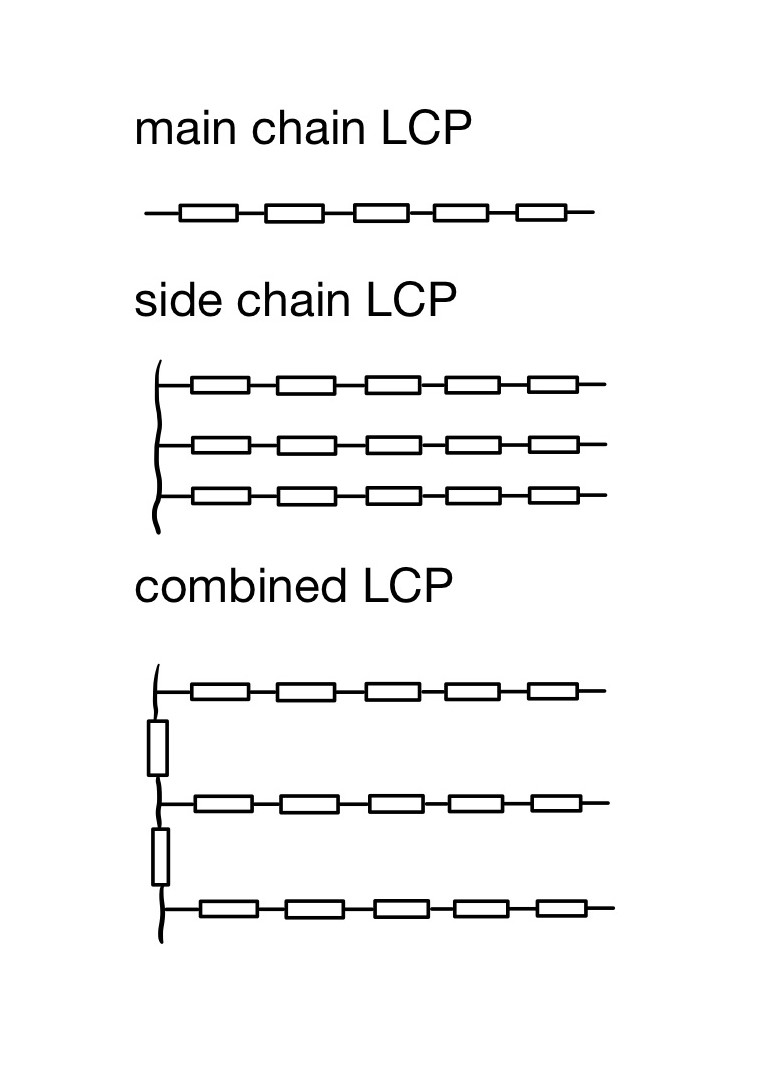
Structure of LCPs

LCPs are categorized by the location of liquid crystal cores. Due to the creation and research of different classes of LCPs, different prefixes are used to help the classification of LCPs. Main chain liquid crystal polymers (MCLCPs) have liquid crystal cores in the main chain. By contrast, side chain liquid crystal polymers (SCLCPs) have pendant side chains containing the liquid crystal cores.

=== Main chain LCP ===
Main chain LCPs have rigid, rod-like mesogens in the polymer backbones, which indirectly leads to the high melting temperature of this kind of LCPs. To make this kind of polymer easy to process, different methods are applied to lower the transition temperature: introducing flexible sequences, introducing bends or kinks, or adding substituent groups to the aromatic mesogens.

=== Side chain LCP ===
In side-chain LCPs, the mesogens are in the polymer side chains. The mesogens usually are linked to the backbones through flexible spacers, although for a few LCPs, the side chains directly link to the backbones. If the mesogens are directly linked to the backbones, the coil-like conformation of the backbones will impede the mesogens from forming an orientational structure. Conversely, by introducing flexible spacers between the backbones and the mesogens, the ordering of mesogens can be decoupled from the conformation of the backbones.

== Mechanism ==
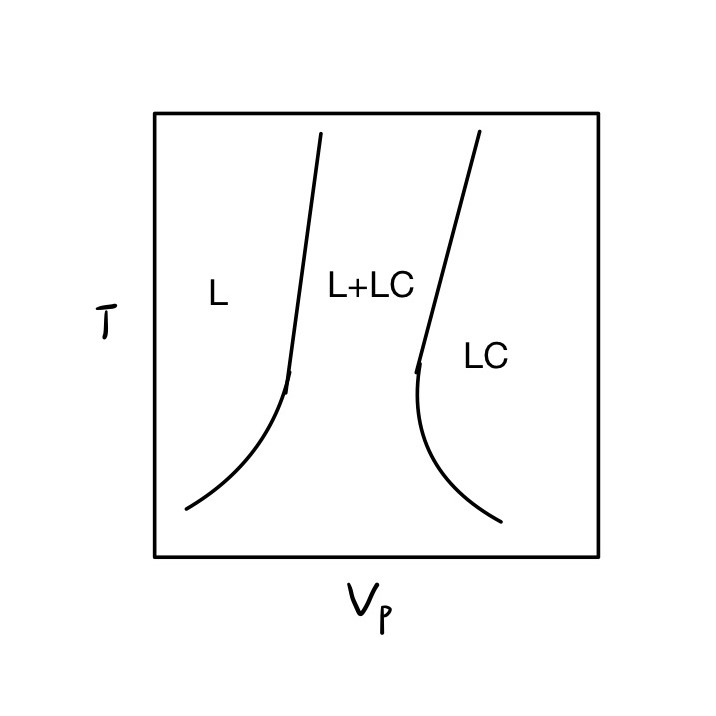
The mechanism for lyotropic systems (L means liquid, LC means liquid crystal, Vp means the volume fraction of the polymer, T means temperature.)

Mesogens in LCPs can self-organize to form liquid crystal regions in different conditions. LCPs can be roughly divided into two subcategories based on the mechanism of aggregation and ordering, but the distinction is not rigidly defined. LCPs can be transformed into liquid crystals with more than one method.

=== Lyotropic systems ===
Lyotropic main chain LCPs have rigid mesogen cores (such as aromatic rings) in the backbones. This type of LCPs forms liquid crystals due to their rigid chain conformation but not only the aggregation of mesogen cores. Because of the rigid structure, strong solvent is needed to dissolve the lyotropic main chain polymers. When the concentration of the polymers reaches critical concentration, the mesophases begin to form and the viscosity of the polymer solution begins to decrease. Lyotropic main chain LCPs have been mainly used to generate high-strength fibers such as Kevlar.

Side chain LCPs usually consist of both hydrophobic and hydrophilic segments. Usually, the side chain ends are hydrophilic. When they are dissolved in water, micelles will form due to hydrophobic force. If the volume fraction of the polymers exceeds the critical volume fraction, the micellar segregates will be packed to form a liquid crystal structure. As the concentration varies above the critical volume fraction, the liquid crystal generated may be packed in different structures. Temperature, the stiffness of the polymers, and the molecular weight of the polymers can affect the liquid crystal transformation.

Lyotropic side chain LCPs such as alkyl polyoxyethylene surfactants attached to polysiloxane polymers may be used in personal care products like liquid soap.

=== Thermotropic systems ===
The study of thermotropic LCPs was catalyzed by the success of lyotropic LCPs. Thermotropic LCPs can only be processed when the melting temperature is far below the decomposition temperature. When above the melting temperature but below the clearing point, the thermotropic LCPs will form liquid crystals. Above the clearing point, the melt will be isotropic and clear again.

Frozen liquid crystals can be obtained by quenching liquid crystal polymers below the glass transition temperature. Copolymerization can be used to adjust the melting temperature and mesophase temperature.

== Liquid crystal elastomers (LCEs) ==
Finkelmann first proposed LCEs in 1981. LCEs attracted attention from researchers and industry. LCEs can be synthesized both from polymeric precursors and from monomers. LCEs can respond to heat, light, and magnetic fields. Nanomaterials can be introduced into LCE matrices (LCE-based composites) to provide different properties and tailor LCEs' ability to respond to different stimuli.

=== Applications ===
LCEs have many applications. For example, LCE films can be used as optical retarders due to their anisotropic structure. Because they can control the polarization state of transmitted light, they are commonly used in 3D glasses, patterned retarders for transflective displays, and flat panel LC displays. Modifying LCE with azobenzene, allows it to show light response properties. It can be applied for controlled wettability, autonomous lenses, and haptic surfaces. Besides the display application, research has focused on other interesting properties such as its special thermally and photogenerated macroscale mechanical responses, which means they can be good actuators.

LCEs are used to make actuators and artificial muscles for robotics. They have been studied for use as lightweight energy absorbers, with potential applications in helmets, body armor, vehicle bumpers, using multi-layered, tilted beams of LCE, sandwiched between stiff supporting structures.

=== Synthesis ===
==== Polymeric precursors ====
LCEs synthesized from the polymeric precursors can be divided into two subcategories:

Poly(hydrosiloxane): A two-step crosslinking technique is applied to derive LCEs from poly(hydrosiloxane). Poly(dydrosiloxane) is mixed with a monovinyl-functionalized liquid crystalline monomer, a multifunctional vinyl crosslinker, and catalyst. This mixture is used to generate a weakly crosslinked gel, in which the monomers are linked to the poly(dydrosiloxane) backbones. During the first crosslinking step or shortly after that, orientation is introduced into the mesogen cores of the gel with mechanical alignment methods. After that, the gel is dehydrated and the crosslinking reaction is completed. Therefore, the orientation is kept in the elastomer by crosslinking. In this way, highly ordered side chain LCEs can be produced, which are also called single-crystal or monodomain LCEs.

LCPs: With LCPs as precursors, a similar two-step method can be applied. Aligned LCPs mixed with multifunctional crosslinkers directly generate LCEs. The mixture is first heated to isotopic. Fibers are drawn from the mixture and then crosslinked, thus the orientation can be trapped in the LCE. However, it is limited by the difficulty of processing caused by the high viscosity of the starting material.

==== Low molar mass monomers ====
Liquid crystal low molar mass monomers are mixed with crosslinkers and catalysts. The monomers can be aligned and then polymerized to keep the orientation. One advantage of this method is that the low molar mass monomers can be aligned by not only mechanical alignment, but also diamagnetic, dielectric, surface alignment. For example, thiol-ene radical step-growth polymerization and Michael addition produce well-ordered LCEs. This is also a good way to synthesize moderately to densely crosslinked glassy LCNs.

The main difference between LCEs and LCNs is the cross link density. LCNs are primarily synthesized from (meth)acrylate-based multifunctional monomers while LCEs usually come from crosslinked polysiloxanes.

== Properties ==
A unique class of partially crystalline aromatic polyesters based on p-hydroxybenzoic acid and related monomers, liquid-crystal polymers are capable of forming regions of highly ordered structure while in the liquid phase. However, the degree of order is somewhat less than that of a regular solid crystal. Typically, LCPs have a high mechanical strength at high temperatures, extreme chemical resistance, inherent flame retardancy, and good weatherability. Liquid-crystal polymers come in a variety of forms from sinterable high temperature to injection moldable compounds. LCPs can be welded, though the lines created by welding are a weak point in the resulting product. LCPs have a high Z-axis coefficient of thermal expansion.

LCPs are exceptionally inert. They resist stress cracking in the presence of most chemicals at elevated temperatures, including aromatic or halogenated hydrocarbons, strong acids, bases, ketones, and other aggressive industrial substances. Hydrolytic stability in boiling water is excellent. Environments that deteriorate the polymers are high-temperature steam, concentrated sulfuric acid, and boiling caustic materials.

Polar and bowlic LCPs are ferroelectrics, with reaction time order-of-magnitudes smaller than that in conventional LCs and could be used to make ultrafast switches. Bowlic columnar polymers possess long, hollow tubes; with metal or transition metal atoms added into the tube, they could potentially form ultrahigh-Tc superconductors.

== Uses ==
Because of their various properties, LCPs are useful for electrical and mechanical parts, food containers, and any other applications requiring chemical inertness and high strength. LCP is particularly good for microwave frequency electronics due to low relative dielectric constants, low dissipation factors, and commercial availability of laminates. Packaging microelectromechanical systems (MEMS) is another area that LCP has recently gained more attention. The superior properties of LCPs make them especially suitable for automotive ignition system components, heater plug connectors, lamp sockets, transmission system components, pump components, coil forms and sunlight sensors and sensors for car safety belts. LCPs are also well-suited for computer fans, where their high tensile strength and rigidity enable tighter design tolerances, higher performance, and less noise, albeit at a significantly higher cost.

== Trade names ==
LCP is sold by manufacturers under a variety of trade names. These include:

- Zenite
- Vectra
- Laperos
- Zenite 5145L
- Xydar
