= Luer taper =

Standardized conical fitting system for small-bore fluid connections

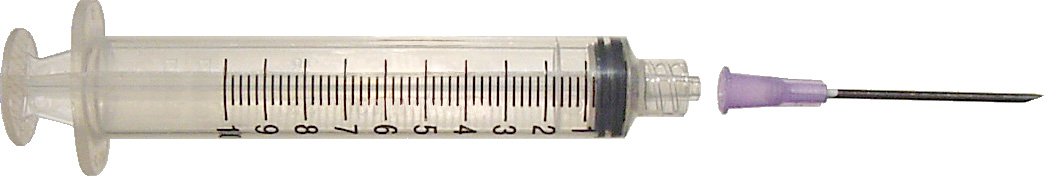
A syringe with a male Luer-lock fitting and a needle with a female Luer-lock fitting

The Luer taper is a standardized conical fitting system used to connect small-bore fluid pathways in medical and laboratory equipment. It consists of mating male and female conical surfaces and is commonly used in hypodermic needles, syringes, stopcocks, catheters and other fluid-handling components.

Luer connections are available in slip and locking forms. Slip fittings rely primarily on friction between the mating tapers, whereas locking fittings use an additional thread or collar to help retain the connection. The conical surfaces provide the mating interface, while the locking mechanism primarily helps prevent accidental separation.

For healthcare applications, requirements for relevant small-bore connectors are specified in parts of the ISO 80369 series. ISO 80369-7 applies to connectors for intravascular or hypodermic applications. It does not apply to every type of Luer connection or to every small-bore connector used in medical and laboratory equipment.

== History ==
The Luer fitting is named after the Lüer family, which founded the medical instrument manufacturer Maison Lüer in Paris. Historical accounts differ regarding the origin of the two-piece syringe. Some accounts attribute its invention to the instrument maker Karl Schneider, while others attribute it to Jeanne Lüer and the glassblower Fournier.

The fitting was patented by Jeanne Lüer's husband, Hermann Wülfing Lüer, in 1894, followed by international patents in subsequent years. The Luer fitting is associated with a nominal 6% taper. In this context, the term "6% taper" describes the change in diameter relative to the axial length of the conical fitting; it does not refer to a six-degree cone angle.

Requirements for conical Luer fittings have been specified in several standards over time. Earlier requirements were published in ISO 594, including ISO 594-1:1986, which described general requirements for conical fittings with a 6% Luer taper for syringes, needles and certain other medical equipment. Related European standards also described conical fittings and locking fittings for syringes, needles and certain medical equipment.

In 1930, Fairleigh S. Dickinson of Becton Dickinson, which had held exclusive rights to market the Luer syringe in the United States since 1898, patented the name "Luer-Lok". The patented fitting used a metal locking component to secure a needle to a syringe.

== Types ==
There are two principal types of Luer connection: slip and locking.

=== Luer-slip fittings ===
Luer-slip fittings have no locking threads or collar. The male and female components are joined by inserting the mating tapers, with retention provided primarily by friction between the conical surfaces.

The resistance of a slip connection to separation depends on factors including dimensional conformity, insertion depth, surface condition, assembly force and the load applied to the connection. Slip fittings are commonly referred to as "slip-tip" fittings.

=== Luer-lock fittings ===
Luer-lock fittings combine a conical mating interface with a mechanical locking feature. Depending on the design, the locking feature may consist of threads, a threaded sleeve or a rotating collar. The locking feature helps retain the connection during handling and use, but it does not replace the dimensional or sealing requirements of the mating tapers.

Luer-lock fittings are commonly divided into one-piece and two-piece designs. In a one-piece design, the body and locking feature are formed as a single component, and locking is achieved by rotating the connector or the connected assembly.

In a two-piece design, a separate collar is assembled around the Luer component. The collar rotates independently and engages with the mating component to retain the connection.

The terms "Luer-Lok" and "Luer-slip" have been used as trademarks associated with Becton Dickinson. The terms "luer lock" and "luer-slip" are also commonly used descriptively for corresponding types of connector, although trademark status and usage may vary by jurisdiction.

== Standards and applications ==
Luer fittings are used in medical and laboratory systems that require small-bore connections for liquids or gases. Applications include syringes, hypodermic needles, stopcocks, catheters, infusion components, sampling devices and laboratory fluid-handling assemblies.

The ISO 80369 series addresses small-bore connectors used in healthcare applications. ISO 80369-7 specifies requirements for connectors used in intravascular or hypodermic applications. Other parts of the ISO 80369 series address connectors intended for different healthcare applications. These connector systems are designed to distinguish certain applications and reduce the possibility of misconnections between incompatible medical systems.

== Testing and performance ==
The performance of a Luer connection may be evaluated through dimensional inspection, leakage testing, pressure testing, separation testing and, for locking designs, torque or locking-force testing. The applicable requirements and test methods depend on the intended application and the relevant product standard.

Dimensional inspection is used to verify the geometry of the male and female tapers and the compatibility of mating components. Leakage and pressure tests evaluate sealing performance under specified conditions. Mechanical tests may evaluate resistance to separation, disconnection or damage during assembly and use.

The performance of a connection can be affected by component dimensions, material properties, surface condition, assembly force, locking condition and the number of connection cycles. Consequently, conformity of the mating geometry alone does not establish suitability for every intended application.

== Limitations and safety considerations ==
A Luer connection is not suitable for every medical or laboratory connection. Components must be selected according to the intended fluid, pressure, temperature, material compatibility and applicable standard.

The similar appearance of some small-bore connectors can create a risk of misconnections when components intended for different applications are used together. Healthcare connector standards therefore distinguish certain applications and specify connector designs intended to reduce the possibility of misconnections.
