= Hermann Wülfing Lüer =

German instrument maker

Hermann Wülfing Lüer (1836–1910) was a German instrument maker working in Paris, who patented the Luer taper, which is named after the Lüer family.

It is possible that this essential medical device, still in use as of 2024, was actually designed by his wife.
