= Francis Rynd =

Irish physician (1801–1861)

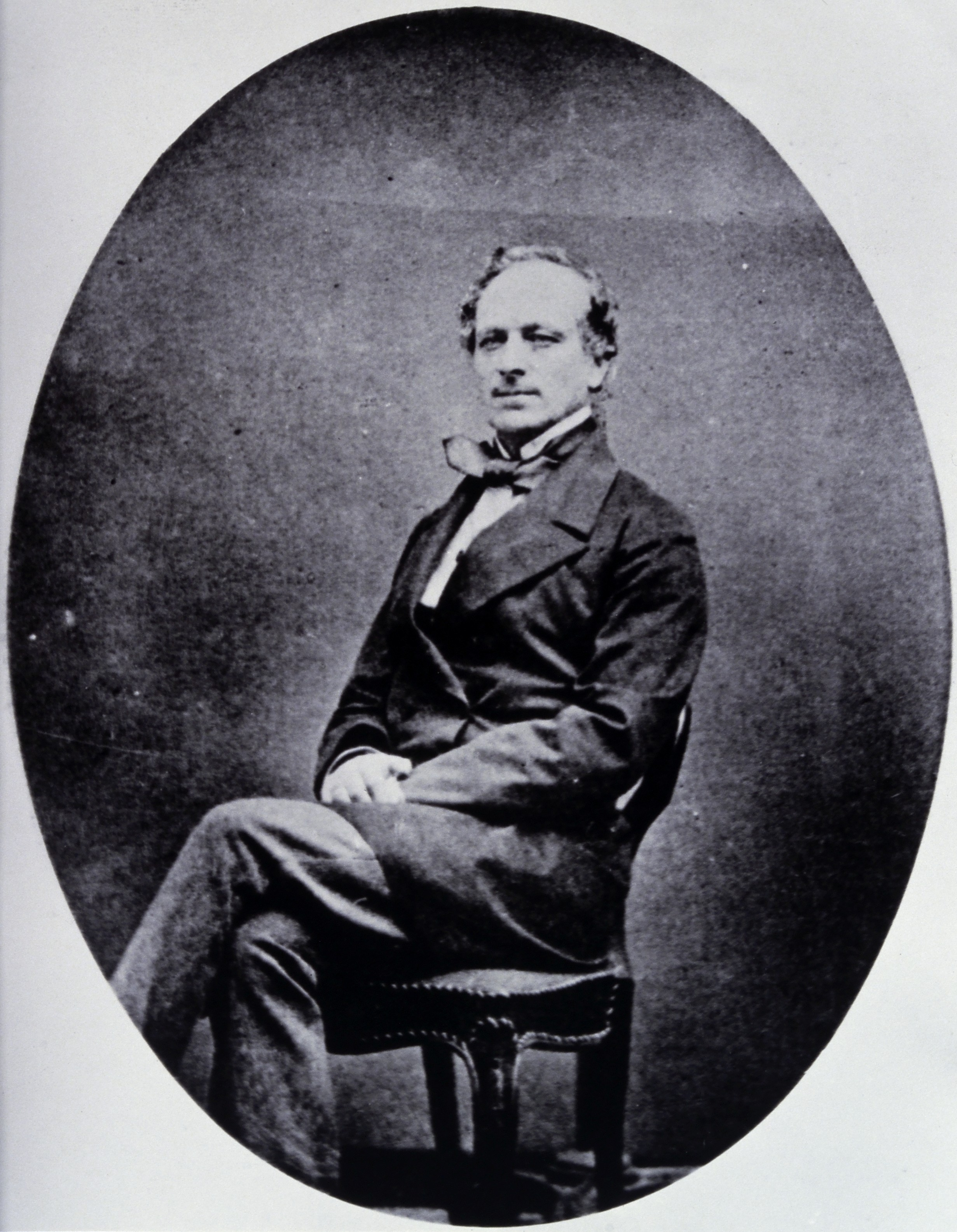
- Born: 1801; Dublin, Ireland
- Died: 19 July 1861 (aged 60); Clontarf, Dublin, Ireland
- Education: Trinity College Dublin
- Known for: Inventing the hypodermic needle and administering the first recorded injection
- Spouse: Elizabeth Alley (m. 1831; died 1859)
- Children: 7
- Relatives: James Alexander Porterfield Rynd (nephew)
- Medical career
- Field: Medicine
- Institutions: Meath Hospital

Francis Rynd (1801 – 19 July 1861) was an Irish medical doctor known for inventing the hypodermic needle used in syringes in 1844, which also led to the first recorded injection. It was one of the major inventions of drug administration. He was also a member of the Royal College of Surgeons in Ireland.

== Early life ==
Rynd was born in Dublin, Ireland, in 1801 to James Rynd and his third wife Hester Fleetwood. Rynd attended medical school at Trinity College Dublin, where he was reputed to be a "wayward" student, known for his busy social life and love of fox hunting.

== Career ==
Rynd worked at the Meath Hospital in Dublin. At the Meath Hospital he trained under surgeon Sir Philip Crampton.

Rynd became a member of the Royal College of Surgeons in Ireland in 1830. In 1836 he took a surgical post in the Meath Hospital working alongside William Stokes and Robert James Graves. Rynd, who had a lucrative private practice, also served as medical superintendent of the Mountjoy Prison.

Rynd was a member of the exclusive Kildare Street Club.

== Hypodermic needle ==
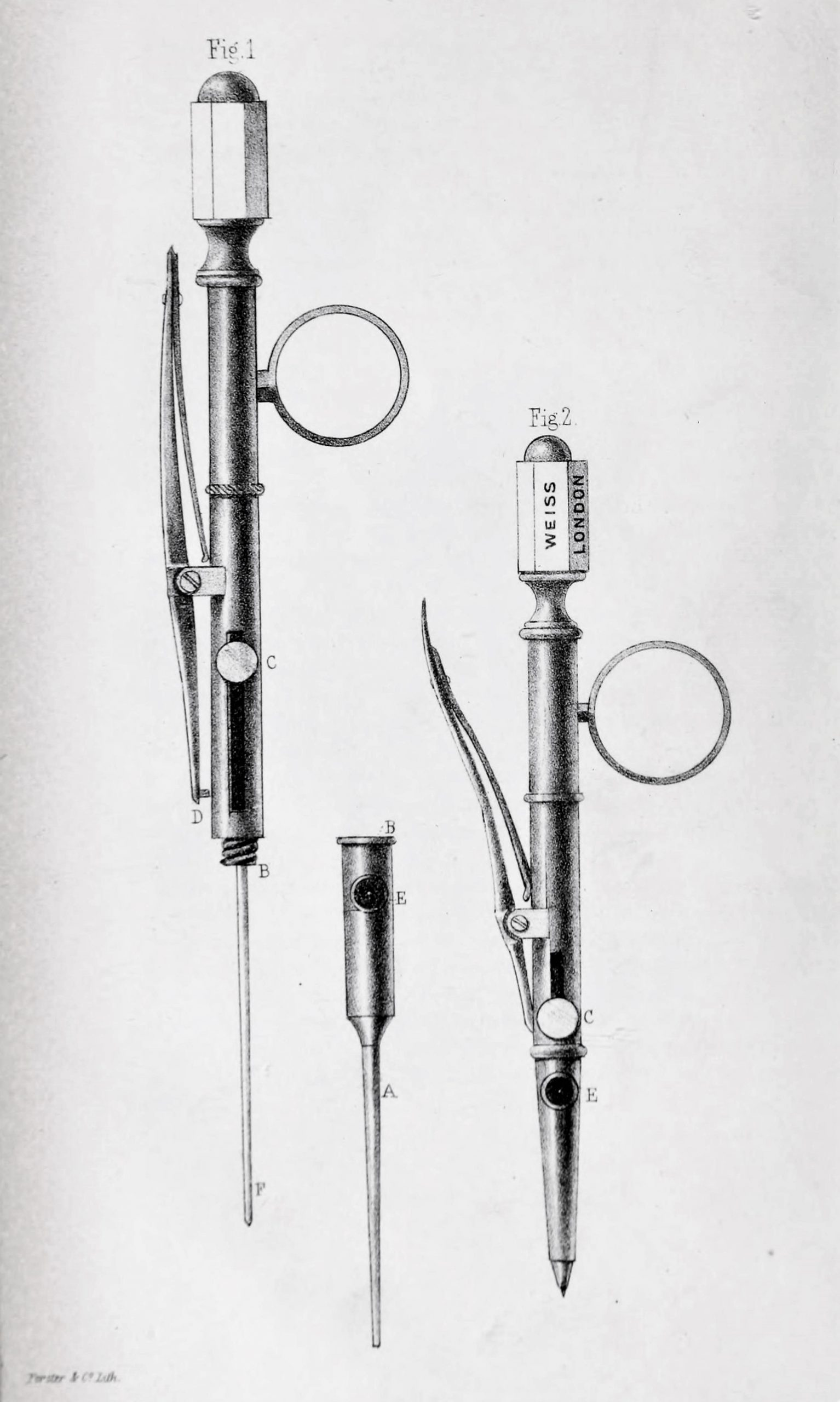
Illustration of Rynd's hypodermic needle shown at F of Fig. 1

In a 12 March 1845 article in the Dublin Medical Press, Rynd outlined how he had injected painkillers into a patient with a hypodermic syringe in on 3 June 1844:

"Margaret Cox, aetat. 59, of spare habit, was admitted into hospital, May 18, 1844, complaining of acute pain over the entire of left side of face, particularly in the supraorbital region, shooting into the eye, along the branches of the portio dura in the cheek, along the gums of both upper and lower jaw, much increased in this situation by shutting the mouth and pressing her teeth close together, and occasionally darting to the opposite side of the face and to the top and back of her head.

On the 3rd of June a solution of fifteen grains of acetate of morphia, dissolved in one drachm of creosote, was introduced to the supra-orbital nerve, and along the course of the temporal, malar, and buccal nerves, by four punctures of an instrument made for the purpose. In the space of a minute all pain (except that caused by the operation, which was very slight) had ceased, and she slept better that night than she had for months. After the interval of a week she had slight return of pain in the gums of both upper and under jaw. The fluid was again introduced by two punctures made in the gum of each jaw, and the pain disappeared. After this the pain did not recur, and she was detained in hospital for some weeks, during which time her health improved, her sleep was restored, and she became quite a happy looking person. She left the hospital on the 1st of August in high spirits, and promised to return if she ever felt the slightest pain again. We conclude she continues well, for we have not heard from her since."

This was the first known hypodermic injection.

== Personal life and family ==
Francis married Elizabeth Alley, daughter of Alderman John Alley who served as Lord Mayor of Dublin, and had three sons and daughters. Rynd named one of his sons Philip Crampton Rynd after his mentor Sir Philip Crampton.

Rynd's half brother, Goodlatte Rynd, Esquire was killed at the Battle of Salamanca in 1812. Francis Rynd's niece by Goodlatte and Lady Harriet Jane Brown, née Temple, Lady Maria Rynd, married Pedro José Domingo de Guerra in 1840, then Bolivia's Consul at Paris. Maria moved to South America and went on to become First Lady of Bolivia in 1879. Her grandson, Jose Gutierrez Guerra, was president of Bolivia between 1917 and 1920.

Rynd's nephew James Alexander Porterfield Rynd was an Irish chess master and barrister.

== Death ==
Rynd died in Clontarf, Dublin on 19 July 1861 at the age of 60.

== Published works ==
- Pathological and Practical Observations on Strictures: And Some Other Diseases of the Urinary Organs (1849)
