= Alexander Wood (physician) =

Scottish physician (1817–1884)

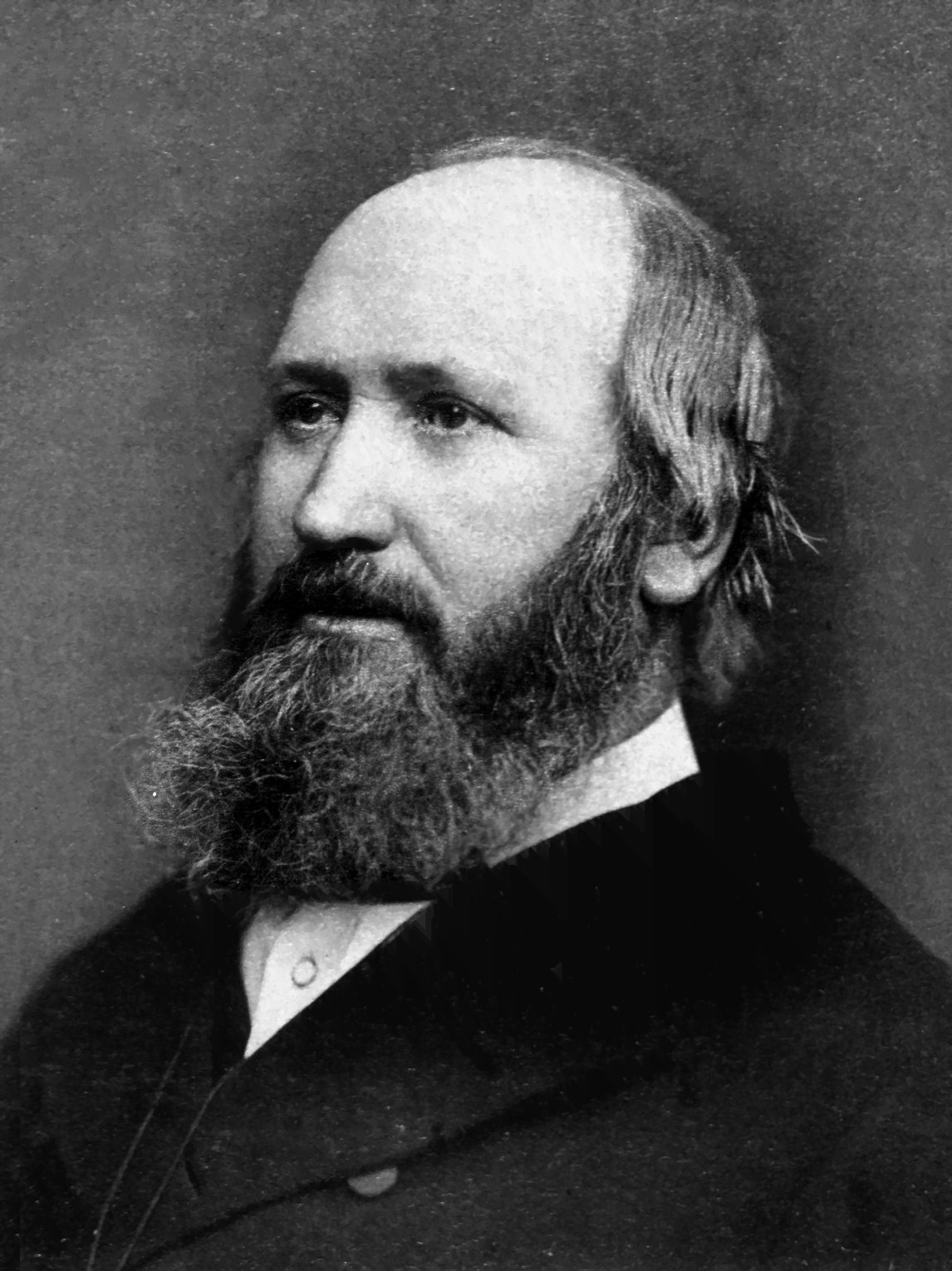
Alexander Wood, 1873

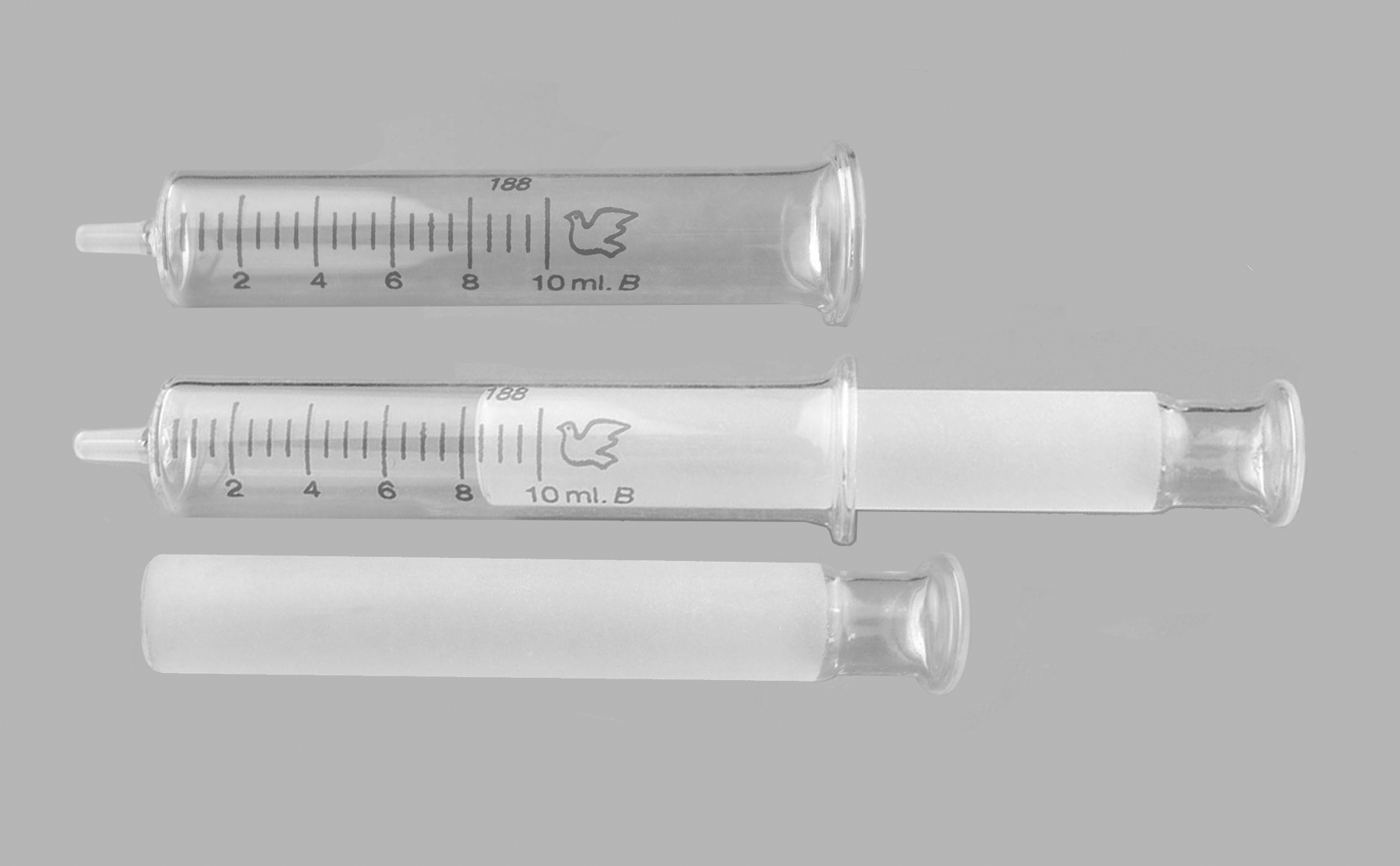
Modern syringe made entirely of glass, essentially identical to Wood's, except for the volume markings.

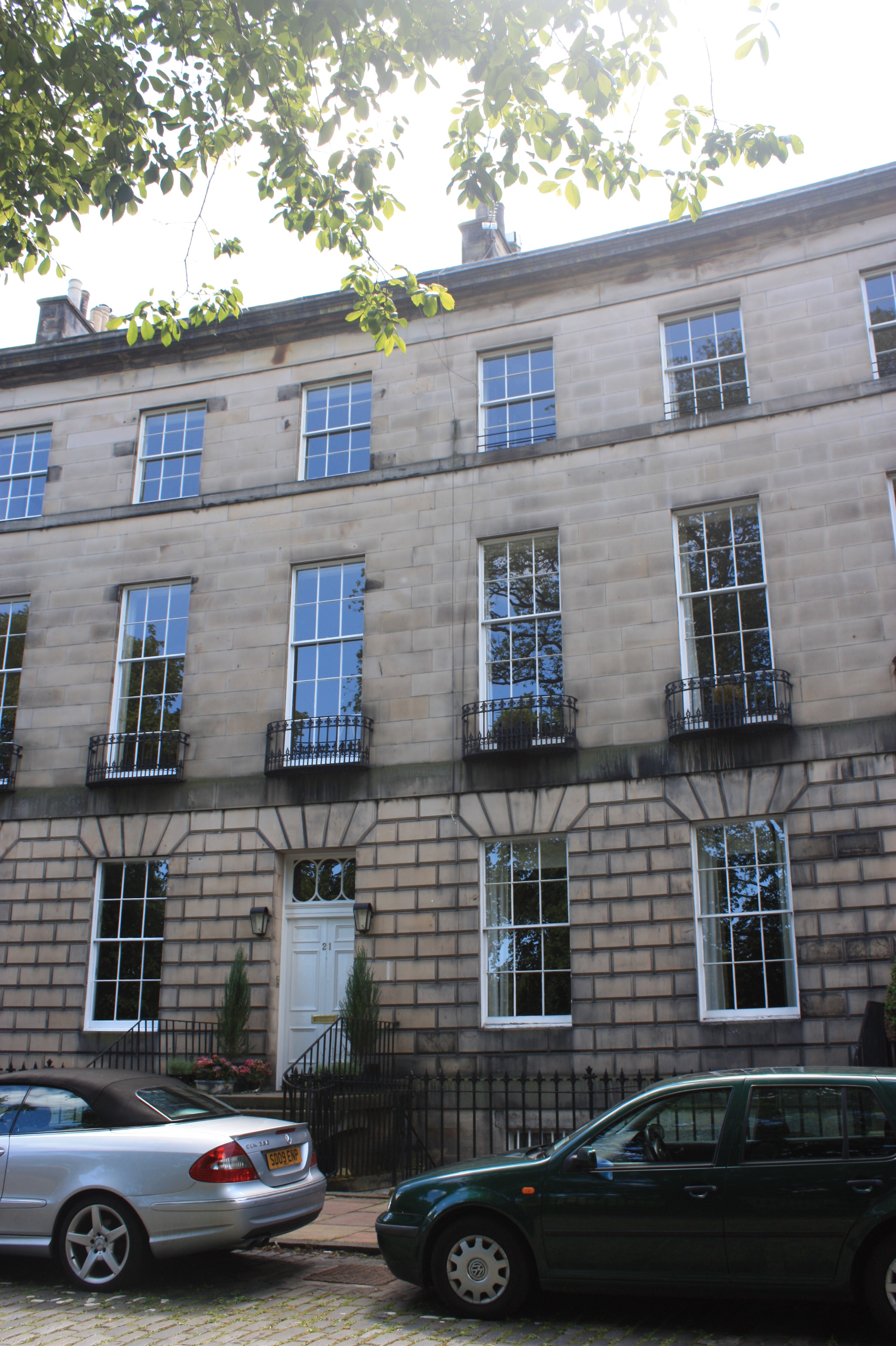
Royal Circus, Edinburgh

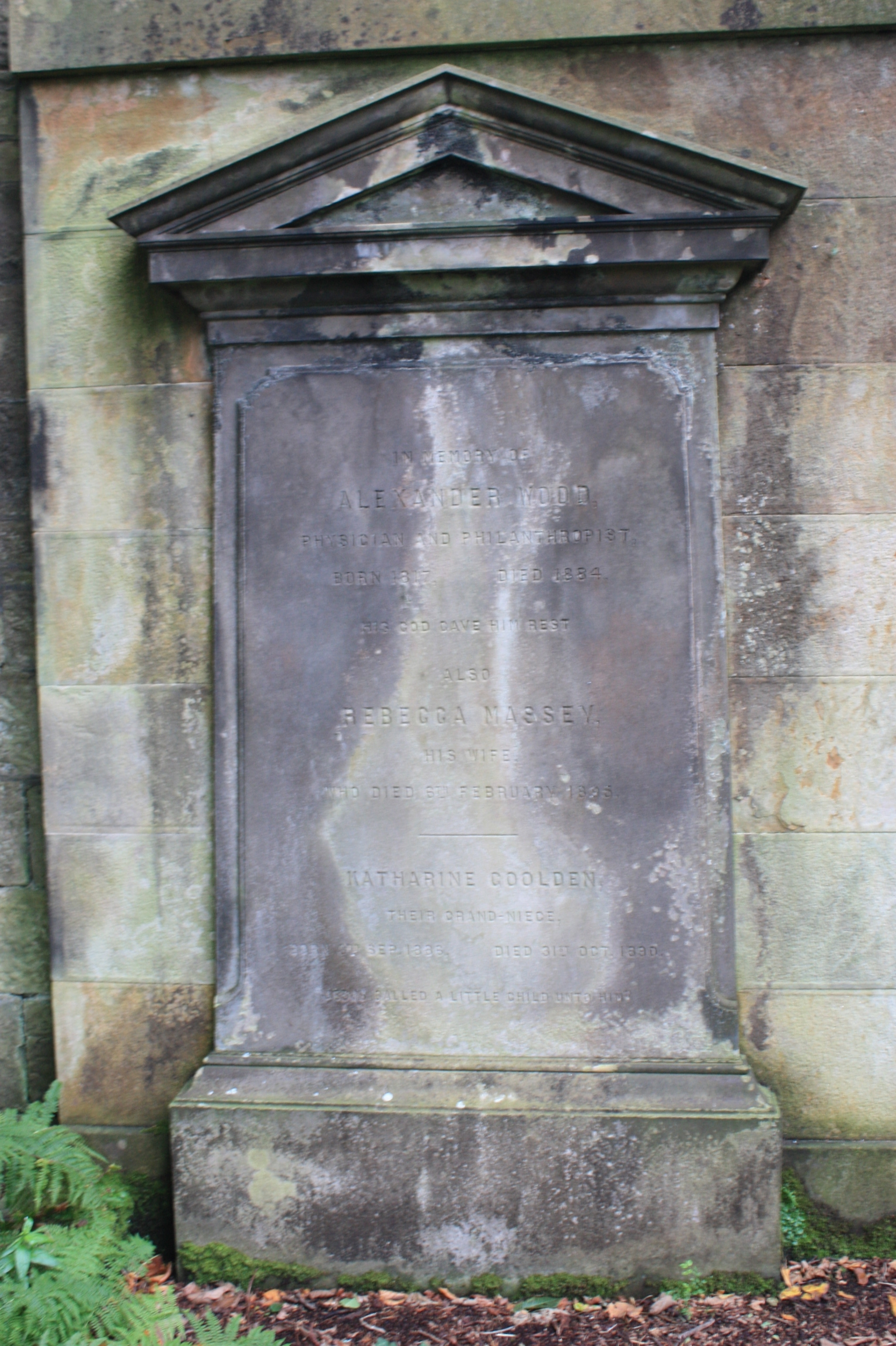
Alexander Wood's grave, Dean Cemetery

Alexander Wood FRSE PRCPE (10 December 1817 – 26 February 1884) was a Scottish physician. He invented the first true hypodermic syringe. He served as President of the Royal College of Physicians of Edinburgh from 1858 to 1861.

== Life ==
The son of Dr John Wood and his wife Mary Wood (John' cousin), Alexander was born on 10 December 1817 in Cupar, Fife. The family moved to Edinburgh around 1825, where they lived at 19 Royal Circus in the Second New Town. He was educated at Edinburgh Academy from 1825 to 1832, and then studied medicine at the University of Edinburgh (MD 1839).

From qualification he worked at the Stockbridge Dispensary near his Edinburgh home. By 1840 he was working as a surgeon and living in his late father's house at 19 Royal Circus. From 1841 he lectured in medicine at the Extra Mural School connected to the University of Edinburgh.

In 1845 Wood was elected a member of the Harveian Society of Edinburgh and served as President in 1868.

In 1853, he invented the first hypodermic needle that used a true syringe and hollow needle. Wood referred to his invention as "subcutaneous" rather than "hypodermic". The term "hypodermic" was actually coined by the English doctor Charles Hunter, whose developments of Wood's invention and research into the method of administering pain relief angered Wood. Wood believed that injections should be directly into the area where pain was felt, because the effect could only be local, whereas Hunter argued that the injection could be given anywhere and had a general effect. The medical community supported Hunter's hypothesis, though it is Wood who has been better remembered subsequently.

Wood's biographer and brother-in-law, the Very Reverend Thomas Brown (1811–1893), wrote that Wood had taken the sting of the bee as his model. Brown also wrote, "At first this new hypodermic method was employed exclusively for the administration of morphia and preparations of opium, but from the outset, Dr Wood pointed to a far wider application." In referring to the preface of a paper on 'New Method of Treating Neuralgia by Subcutaneous Injection', separately published in 1855, Brown quotes Wood as saying, "In all probability, what is true in regard to narcotics would be found to be equally true in regard to other classes of remedies."

Wood was elected President of the Royal College of Physicians of Edinburgh in 1858.

In 1863 he was elected a Fellow of the Royal Society of Edinburgh, his proposer being James David Forbes.

In later life Wood lived at 12 Strathearn Place in the Grange in southern Edinburgh.

Wood was buried with his wife, Rebecca Massey, in Dean Cemetery in Edinburgh. The grave lies on an east-facing section of the obscured southern terrace. The gravestone corroborates a later date for his wife's death, on 6 February 1895.

== Family ==
In 1842 he married Rebecca Massey.

It is, however, a false rumour that Rebecca Massey was the first known intravenous morphine addict and died of an overdose delivered by her husband's invention; Richard Davenport-Hines says, 'It is a myth: she outlived him, and survived until 1895.'

== Recognition ==
The Very Rev Thomas Brown wrote a biography of Wood, entitled A Sketch of the Life and Work of Alexander wood MD FRCP in 1886.
