= Drug injection =

Method of introducing a drug

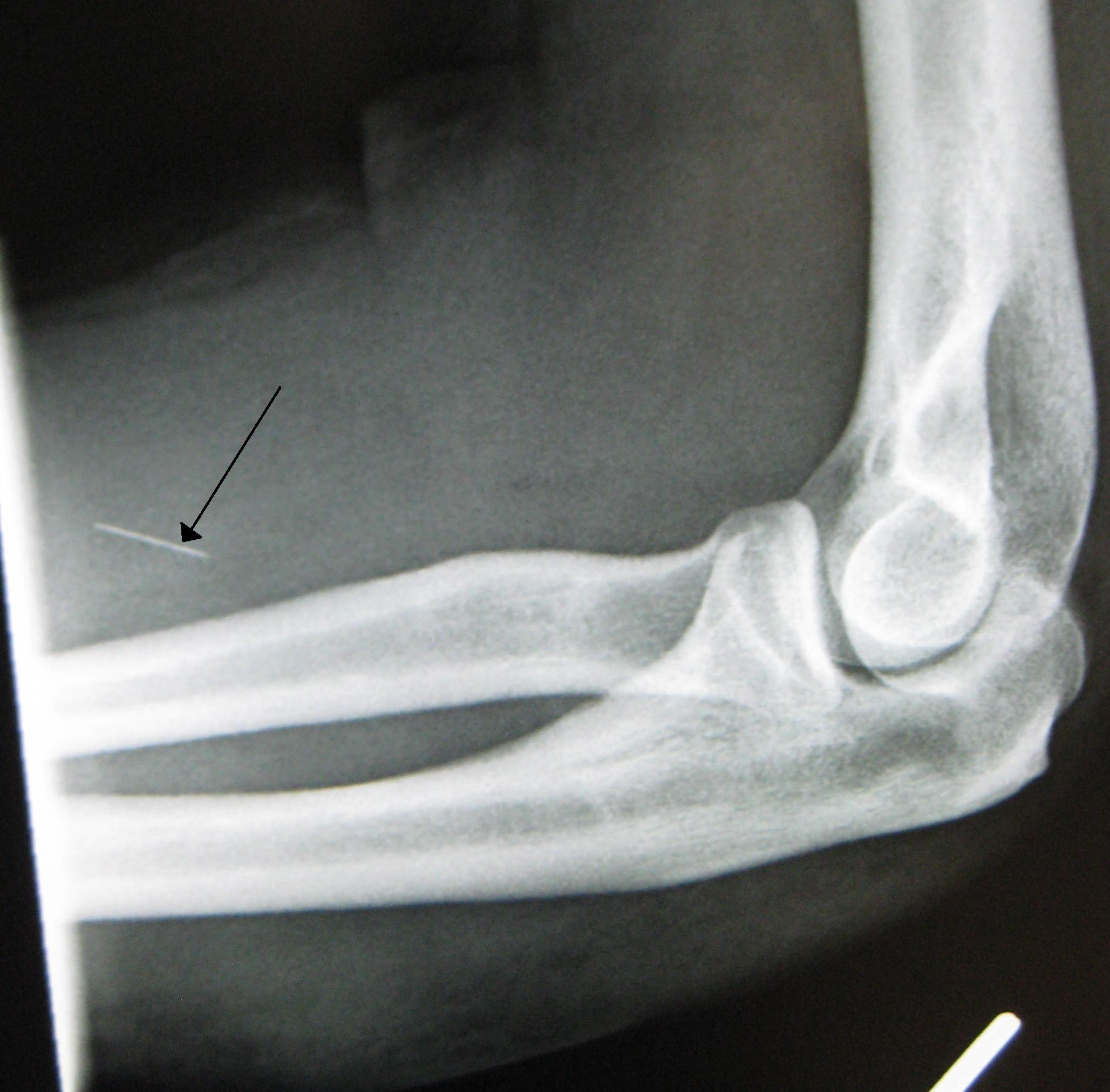
Fragment of a hypodermic needle stuck inside the arm of an IV drug user (x-ray)

Drug injection is a method of introducing a drug into the bloodstream via a hollow hypodermic needle, which is pierced through the skin into the body (usually intravenously, but also at an intramuscular or subcutaneous, location). Intravenous therapy, a form of drug injection, is universally practiced in modernized medical care. As of 2004, there were 13.2 million people worldwide who self-administered injection drugs outside of medical supervision, of which 22% are from developed countries.

A wide variety of drugs are injected, often opioids: these may include legally prescribed medicines and medication such as morphine, as well as stronger compounds often favored in recreational drug use, which are often illegal. Ketamine administered intravenously in clinical settings has become more common. Although there are various methods of taking drugs, injection is favoured by some people as the full effects of the drug are experienced very quickly, typically in five to ten seconds. It also bypasses first-pass metabolism in the liver, resulting in higher bioavailability and efficiency for many drugs (such as morphine or diacetylmorphine/heroin; roughly two-thirds of which is destroyed in the liver when consumed orally) than oral ingestion would. The effect is that the person gets a stronger (yet shorter-acting) effect from the same amount of the drug. Drug injection is therefore often related to substance dependence.

In recreational-use drug culture, preparation may include mixing the powdered drug with water to create an aqueous solution, and then the solution is injected. This act is often colloquially referred to as "slamming", "shooting up", "smashing", "banging", "pinning", or "jacking-up", often depending on the specific drug subculture in which the term is used (e.g. heroin, cocaine, or methamphetamine).

== Risks ==
In addition to general problems associated with any IV drug administration (see risks of IV therapy), there are some specific problems associated with the injection of drugs by non-professionals, such as:

- Increased chance of overdose

- Arterial damage – Arterial pseudoaneurysms may form at injection sites, which can rupture, potentially resulting in hemorrhage, distal ischemia, and gangrene. Inadvertent intra-arterial injection can also result in endarteritis and thrombosis, with ultimately similar consequences.

== Methods ==
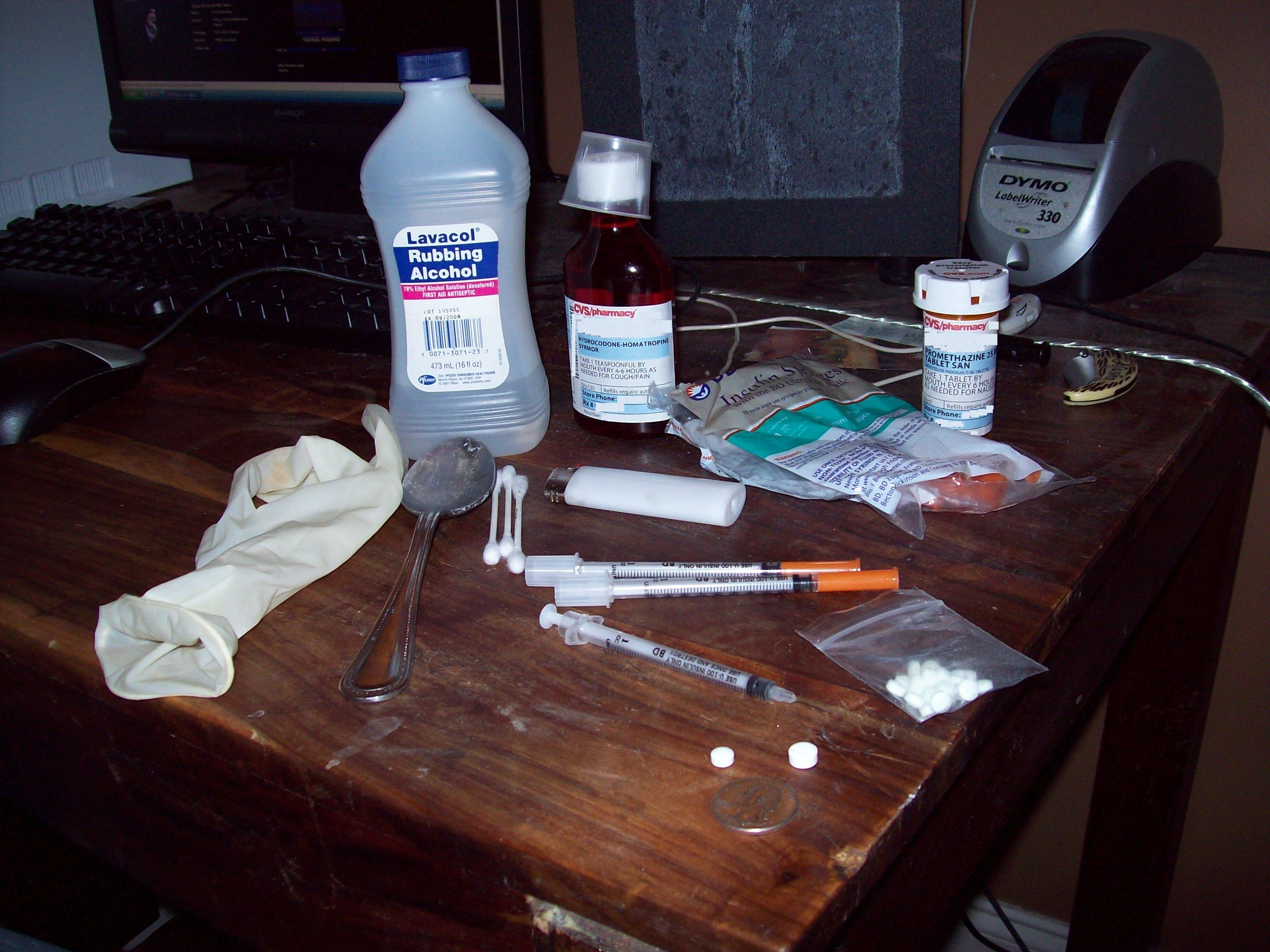
A clandestine kit containing materials to inject drugs, a bottle of a type of lean, promethazine, an antiemetic, and unidentified pills

The drug—usually (but not always) in a powder or crystal form—is dissolved in water, normally in a spoon, tin, bottle cap, the bottom of a soda can, or another metal container. Cylindrical metal containers—sometimes called "cookers"—are provided by needle exchange programs. Users draw the required amount of water into a syringe and squirt this over the drugs. The solution is then mixed and heated from below if necessary. Heating is used mainly with heroin (though not always, depending on the type of heroin), but is also often used with other drugs, especially crushed tablets. Cocaine HCl (powdered cocaine) dissolves quite easily without heat. Heroin prepared for the European market is insoluble in water and usually requires the addition of an acid such as citric acid or ascorbic acid (Vitamin C) powder to dissolve the drug. Due to the dangers from using lemon juice or vinegar to acidify the solution, packets of citric acid and Vitamin C powder are available at needle exchanges in Europe. In the U.S., vinegar and lemon juice are used to shoot crack cocaine. The acids convert the water-insoluble cocaine base in crack to a cocaine salt (cocaine acetate or cocaine citrate), which is water-soluble (like cocaine hydrochloride).

Once the drugs are dissolved, a small syringe (usually 0.5, 1 or 3 cc) is used to draw the solution through a syringe filter, alternatively cotton from a cigarette filter or cotton swab (cotton bud) is used. "Tuberculin" syringes and types of syringes used to inject insulin are commonly used. Commonly used syringes usually have a built-in 28 gauge (or thereabouts) needle typically 1/2 or 5/8 inches long.

The most commonly preferred injection site is the crook of the elbow (i.e., the Median cubital vein), on the user's non-dominant arm. Other users opt to use the Basilic vein; while it may be easier to "hit", caution must be exercised as two nerves run parallel to the vein, increasing the chance of nerve damage, as well as the chance of an arterial "nick".

Regarding route of administration, much injection drug use, but not all, is intravenous injection, whereas some is subcutaneous injection or intramuscular injection (including skin popping, which often involves a depot injection).

== Recreational drugs ==
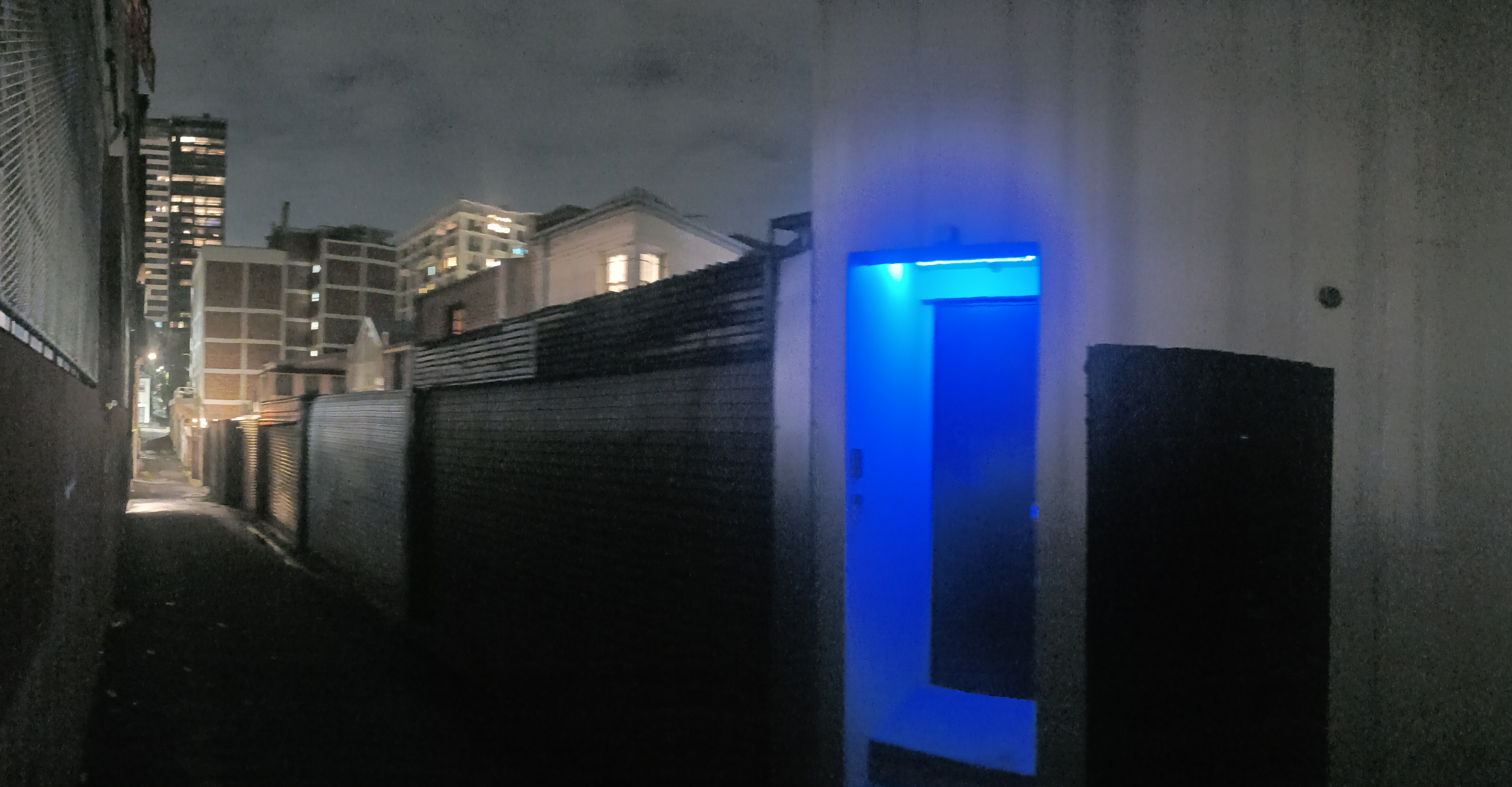
A laneway in Darlinghurst, Sydney with a blue light to prevent intravenous drug use. 2026.

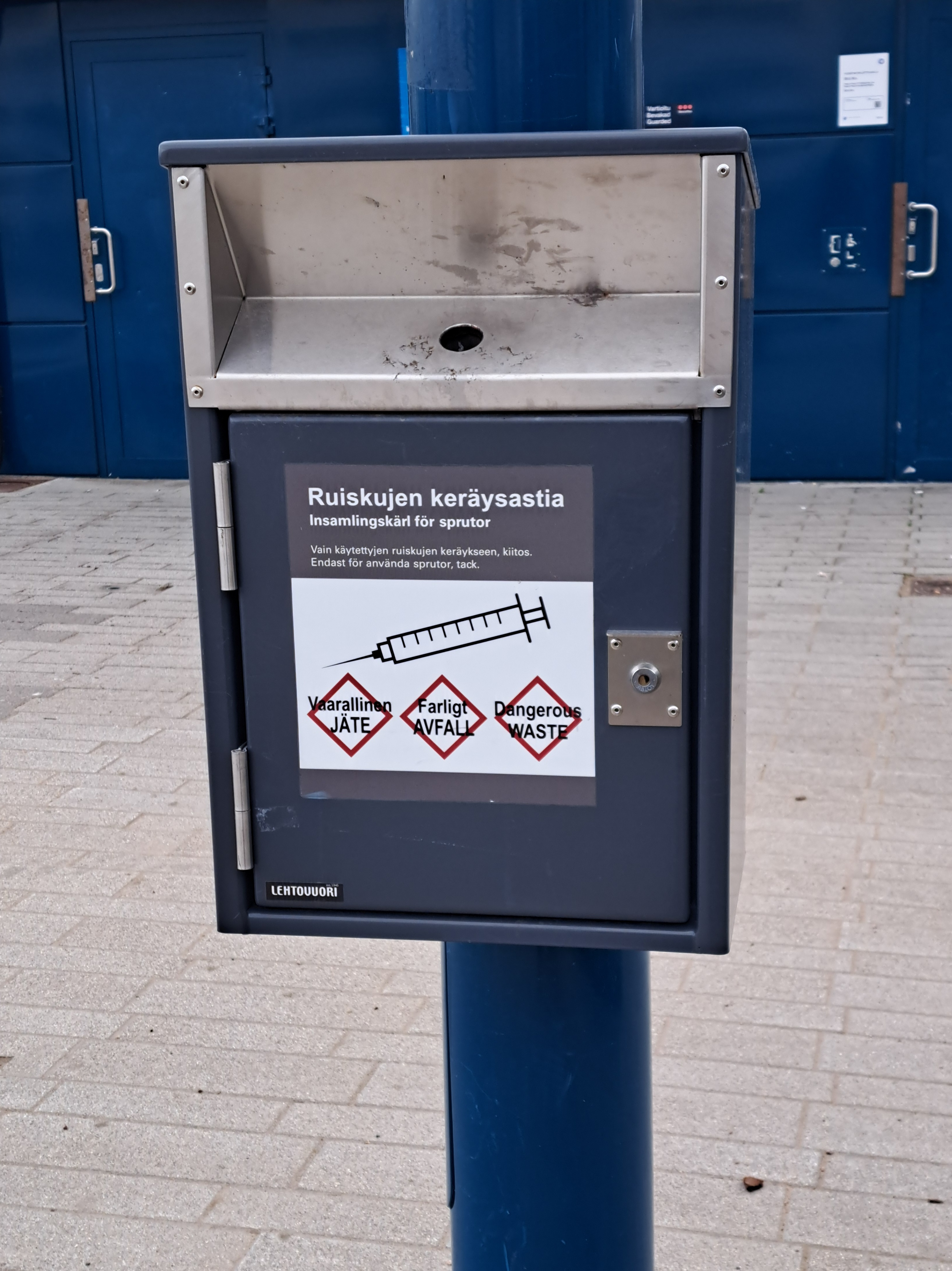
A sharps bin in Mannerheim Park, Oulu, Finland. 2025

=== Risks ===
==== Substances ====
===== Contraindicated substances =====
- Codeine - Injectable codeine is available for subcutaneous or intramuscular injection only; intravenous injection is contraindicated as this can result in non-immune mast-cell degranulation and resulting anaphylactoid reaction.
- Ethchlorvynol is not compatible with intravenous injection and serious injury (including the loss of limbs due to vascular injury) or death can occur when it is used in this manner.
- Hydroxyzine (brand name Atarax, and Vistaril) is contraindicated for subcutaneous, intra-articular, or subcutaneous administration.

===== Street drugs =====
- Black tar heroin is notably risky to inject.

==== Infections ====
Risks from drug injection are caused by a variety of factors, including unclean or unsafe injection practices such as blood flashing and repeated injections at the same site. Injection drug users that fail to adequately sanitize the skin or use clean injection products are at increased risk for cellulitis, abscesses, and thrombophlebitis; these infections can subsequently result in sepsis and bacteremia, which can be fatal if untreated. Repetitive injections, especially those with unsafe practices, can result in additional medical concerns that include thrombosis formation and infectious endocarditis. In rare cases osteomyelitis of the chest can be caused by IV drug use.

Additional risks from unsafe injection practices result primarily from sharing materials (needles, cookers, syringes) used in injection. Blood-borne pathogens, such as HIV, Hepatitis B, and C are of particular concern among injection drug users who share supplies, and increase the likelihood of infection. An added challenge, is that not only infected individuals know their positive status and continue to share supplies, placing other users at risk for infection as well. 30-50% of adults will not experience acute Hepatitis B symptoms, and those that do experience lethargy, nausea, upper abdominal pain, muscle aches, or a darkening of urine will need to connect these symptoms to a possible infection to seek care and limit spreading of the virus.

Of all the ways to ingest drugs, injection carries the most risks by far as it bypasses the body's natural filtering mechanisms against viruses, bacteria, and foreign objects. There will always be much less risk of overdose, disease, infections, and health problems with alternatives to injecting, such as smoking, insufflation (snorting or nasal ingestion), or swallowing.

Drug injection is also commonly a component in HIV-related syndemics. Fragments from injection of pills are known to clog the small blood vessels of the lungs, brain, and elsewhere, potentially causing pulmonary embolism (PE), stroke, or venous embolism. A small proportion of PE is due to the embolization of air, fat, and talc in the drugs of people who inject substances. More commonly, the inflammatory response to these foreign objects causes granulation tissue to form in the capillary beds, resulting in vasculitis, and, when it occurs in the pulmonary capillary bed, potentially pulmonary talcosis. Hitting arteries and nerves is dangerous, painful, and presents its own similar spectrum of problems.

The injection of talc from crushed pills has been associated with pulmonary talcosis in intravenous drug users.

=== Harm reduction ===
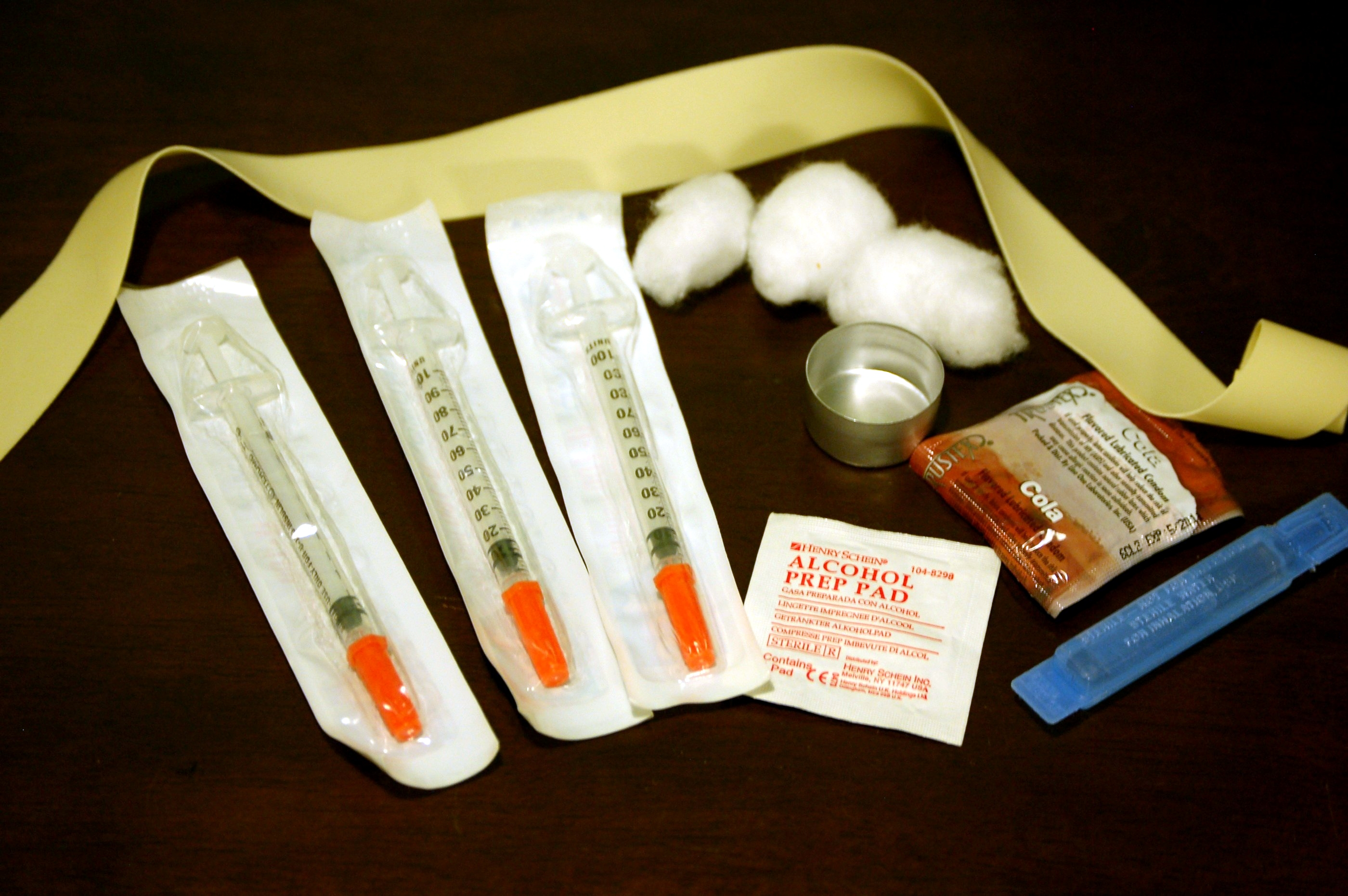
A sterile and safe injection kit obtained from a needle exchange program

Harm reduction is a public health approach that serves as an alternative to abstinence-only guidance. While it does not condone the use of illicit or illegal drugs, it does seek to reduce the harms, risks and dangers associated with illicit drug use, both for the person using illicit drugs and the wider community. Injection drug users that re-use drug delivery components put themselves and others at risk for diseases such as HIV, hepatitis B, and hepatitis C, as well as increase their chances of getting a serious infection. In 2015, the CDC performed an HIV Surveillance Report and attributed 2,392 (6%) of new HIV diagnoses to IV drug use in the US.

A prominent method for addressing the issue of disease transmission among intravenous drug users are needle exchange programs (also known as syringe exchange programs, syringe service programs or needle-syringe programs), where people who inject drugs (PWID) can access sterile needles, syringes, and other paraphernalia. In addition to providing sterile devices used in drug injection, these programs often offer access to infectious disease testing, referrals for substance use or mental health treatment programs, and more. The idea behind harm reduction approaches is to slow disease transmission, such as HIV/AIDS and hepatitis B and hepatitis C, and promote public health by reducing the practice of sharing used needles.

In countries where harm reduction programs are limited or non-existent, it is quite common for IV users to use a single needle repeatedly or share with other users. It is also quite uncommon for a sterilizing agent to be used on needles and syringes. This creates a high risk population for the spread of bloodborne pathogens.

A new approach to reduce harm to IV drug users was recently started in Southern Nevada in 2017. Trac-B Exchange - Southern Nevada Harm Reduction Program was approved in early 2017 to help reduce the spread of HIV in "People Who Inject Drugs". In Nevada, the sharing of needles for drug injections has led to an increase in the spread of HIV and hepatitis B and C. In an effort to reduce the spread of blood borne pathogens, Southern Nevada installed vending machines to give access to sterile needles to those using them for drug injections. Individuals who use these vending machines are required to register with Trac-B and are allowed 2 boxes a week. The boxes contain sterile needles as well as other supplies necessary to reduce the risk of spreading blood borne pathogens. This is a pilot program for increasing injection safety and, if successful, may expand to other areas of the United States. Although this is a new idea in the United States, it was tested in Europe over 20 years ago. In order to combat the AIDS epidemic that was spreading across Europe, France allowed pharmacies to dispense needles without a prescription and implemented needle exchange programs. In 1996, they began a pilot program of syringe vending machines, similar to a coin-operated vending machine. The first vending machines were placed in Marseille due to its high occurrence of AIDS caused by sharing of needles. The results of their study was published in 1999. They found that when the availability of syringes increased, more and more people began to purchase sterile needles. It also provided a discreet way for people to purchase needles without having to feel embarrassed going into a pharmacy. They theorized that with greater access to sterile needles, they would expect to see a reduction in bloodborne pathogen cases.

Beyond just needle exchange programs, the other major harm reduction strategy for drug users are safe injecting facilities (SIFs). These provide a sterile environment for people who inject drugs to do so cleanly, and with sterile syringes which are forced to be thrown away after use so that no re-use occurs. The first of these facilities opened in Switzerland, but there are now over 100 globally including one in Vancouver - Canada, Sydney - Australia, and most recently, Melbourne - Australia.

== Modifications ==
Particularly for intravenous administration, self-injection in the arm can be awkward, and some people modify a syringe for single-handed operation by removing the plunger and affixing a bulb such as from a large dropper or baby pacifier to the end of the barrel to in effect make it a large dropper with a needle affixed. This is therefore a variant of the common method of injection with a dropper with the hypodermic needle affixed, using a "collar" made of paper or other material to create a seal between the needle and dropper. Removing part of the plunger assembly by cutting off most of the shaft and thumb rest and affixing the bulb to the end of the barrel, thereby allowing the bulb to operate the plunger by suction, also does work in many cases.

An alternative to syringes in the 1970s was to use a glass medicine dropper, supposedly easier to manipulate with one hand. A large hairpin was used to make a hole in the skin and the dropper containing the drug (usually heroin) was inserted and the bulb squeezed, releasing it into the tissues. This method was also reported—by William S. Burroughs and other sources—for intravenous administration at least as far back as 1930.

== Alternatives ==
The closest method to IV/overall injection use, in terms of rapid onset, optimal bioavailability, and reduced health risks for most drugs, tends to be rectal administration via concentrated liquid solution (also known as a suppository), usually consisting of only ~1-3ml of liquid (typically not exceeding 5-10ml) assuming the drug in question possesses sufficient water solubility. While oral morphine has a general bioavailability range is only 20-40%, properly administered rectal use of liquid morphine has an effective bioavailability of roughly 70%, or more than double the overall potency of oral morphine and more than two thirds that of IV use. Swallowing tends to be the safest and slowest method of ingesting drugs. It is safer as the body has a much greater chance to filter out impurities. As orally administered drugs take effect later, the effects tend to last longer as well, making oral administration a preferred method among dance and rave groups for drugs such as amphetamine and MDMA. People rarely take heroin orally, as it is converted to morphine in the stomach and its potency is reduced by more than 65% in the process. However, oral bioavailability of opioids is heavily dependent on the substance, dose, and patient in ways that are not yet understood.

== History ==
IV drug use is a relatively recent phenomenon arising from the invention of re-usable syringes and the synthesis of chemically pure morphine and cocaine.

It was noted that administering drugs intravenously strengthened their effect, and—since such drugs as heroin and cocaine were already being used to treat a wide variety of ailments—many patients were given injections of "hard" drugs for such ailments as alcoholism and depression.

=== Origin and early use ===
The hypodermic needle and syringe in its current form was invented by the French scientist Charles Pravaz in 1851, and became especially known during the wars of that and the subsequent decade. However, the first well-known attempt to inject drugs into the body was a 1667 attempt to inject a solution of opium into a dog, and some had suspected that parenteral administration of drugs may work better based on the practise of rubbing opium and other drugs into sores or cuts on the skin for the purpose of causing systemic absorption and the beginnings of scientific understanding of the functioning of the lungs.

During most of the 1850s, the previously held belief that opiate dependence and addiction (often called "the opium appetite", or, when relevant, the "morphine appetite" or "codeine appetite") was due to the drug's action on the digestive system—just like any hunger or thirst—caused doctors to opt to inject morphine rather than administer it orally, in the hope that addiction would not develop. Certainly, by c. 1870 or earlier, it was manifest that this was not the case and the title of earliest morphine addict as the term is currently understood is often given to Pravaz' wife, although habituation through orally ingesting the drug was known before this time, including Friedrich Sertürner and his associates, followers, wife, and dog. To some extent, it was also believed early on that bypassing the lungs would prevent opium addiction, as well as habituation to tobacco. Ethanol in its usual form generally is not injected and can be very damaging by most routes of injection; in modern times, it is used as an alternative or potentiator of phenol (carbolic acid) in procedures to ablate damaged nerves.

In or shortly after 1851, the drugs which had been discovered and extracted from their plants of origin and refined into pure crystalline salts soluble in water included morphine (1804 or late 1803), codeine (1832), narcotine/noscapine (1803–1805?), papaverine (1814), cocaine (1855), caffeine (1819), quinine (1820), atropine (1831), scopolamine (aka hyoscine, aka laevo-duboisine) (1833?), hyoscyamine or laevo-atropine (1831), opium salts mixtures (c. 1840s), chloral derivatives (1831 et seq.), ephedrine (1836?), nicotine (1828), and many others of all types, psychoactive and not. Morphine in particular was used much more widely after the invention of the hypodermic syringe, and the practise of local anaesthesia by infiltration was another step forward in medicine resulting from the hypodermic needle, discovered at around the same time that it was determined that cocaine produced useful numbing of the mucous membranes and eye.

A wide variety of drugs are injected. Among the most popular in many countries are morphine, heroin, cocaine, amphetamine, and methamphetamine. Prescription drugs—including tablets, capsules, and even liquids and suppositories—are also occasionally injected. This applies particularly to prescription opioids, since some opioid addicts already inject heroin. Injecting preparations which were not intended for this purpose is particularly dangerous because of the presence of excipients (fillers), which can cause blood clots. Injecting codeine into the bloodstream directly is dangerous because it causes a rapid histamine release, which can lead to potentially fatal anaphylaxis and pulmonary edema. Dihydrocodeine, hydrocodone, nicocodeine, and other codeine-based products carry similar risks. Codeine may instead be injected by the intramuscular or subcutaneous route. The effect will not be instant, but the dangerous and unpleasant massive histamine release from the intravenous injection of codeine is avoided. To minimize the amount of undissolved material in fluids prepared for injection, a filter of cotton or synthetic fiber is typically used, such as a cotton-swab tip or a small piece of cigarette filter.

Some manufacturers add the narcotic antagonist naloxone or the anticholinergics atropine and homatropine (in lower than therapeutic doses) to their pills to prevent injection. Unlike naloxone, atropine does indeed help morphine and other narcotics combat neuralgia. The atropine may very well not present a problem, and there is the possibility of atropine content reduction of soluble tablets by placing them on an ink blotter with a drop of water on top, then preparing a shot from the remainder of the pill. Canada and many other countries prohibit manufacturers from including secondary active ingredients for the above reason; their Talwin PX does not contain naloxone. However, as a narcotic agonist–antagonist, pentazocine and its relatives can cause withdrawal in those physically dependent upon narcotics.

== See also ==
- Air embolism
- Extravasation (intravenous)
- Lethal injection
- Needle and syringe programmes
- Needle remover
- Needlestick injury
- Safety syringe
- Supervised injection site
