= Skin track =

Skin tracks are a cutaneous condition that result secondary to intravenous drug abuse.

== See also ==
- Scar
- Skin pop scar
- Wound healing
- Postinflammatory hyperpigmentation
- List of cutaneous conditions
