= Loop mark =

- Specialty: Dermatology

Loop marks are a cutaneous condition, caused by beating with a doubled-over cord. They are perhaps the single most characteristic finding in child abuse.

== See also ==
- Skin pop scar
- List of cutaneous conditions
