= Needle remover =

Medical device

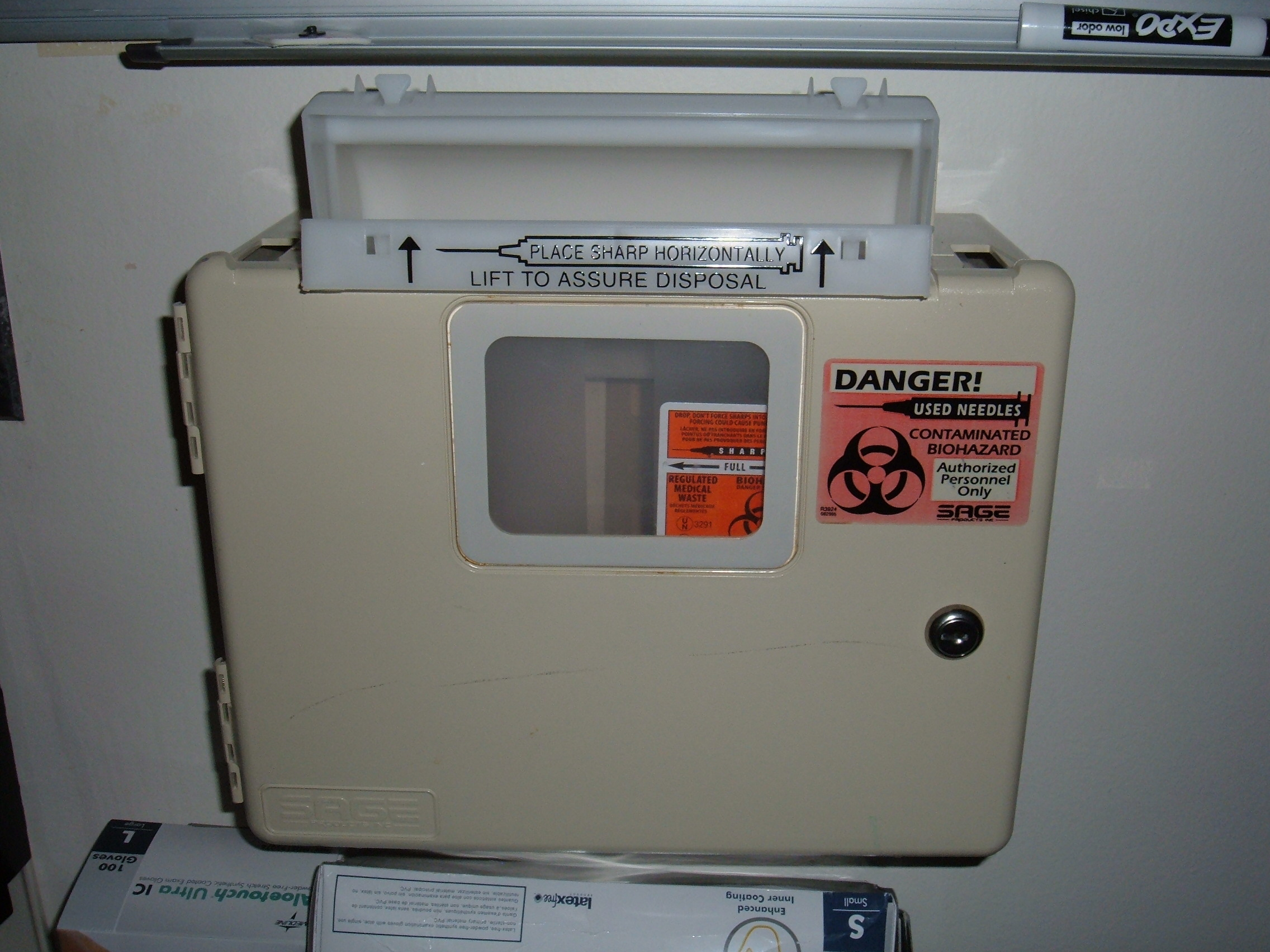
A wall-mounted sharps container

A needle remover is a device used to physically remove a needle from a syringe. In developing countries, there is still a need for improvements in needle safety in hospital settings as most of the needle removal processes are done manually and under severe risk of hazard from needles puncturing skin risking infection. These countries cannot afford needles with individual safety devices attached, so needle-removers must be used to remove the needle from the syringe. This lowers possible pathogen spread by preventing the reuse of the syringes, reducing incidents of accidental needle-sticks, and facilitating syringe disposal.

== Background ==
In regions surveyed by the World Health Organization (WHO) in the early 2000s, the reported number of needle-stick injuries in developing world countries ranged from .93 to 4.68 injuries per person and per year, which is five times higher than in industrialized nations. Needle-stick injuries are further complicated by disease transmission, such as Hepatitis B, Hepatitis C and HIV. In Ghana, a study of 803 schoolchildren revealed that 61.2% had at least one marker of hepatitis B virus. As a result, health care workers, patients, and the community in developing nations are at an increased risk of contracting blood-borne pathogens via the reuse and improper disposal of needles, and accidental needle-sticks.

In the U.S., the Needlestick Safety Act signed in 2000 and the 2001 Bloodborne Pathogens Standard both mandated the use of safety devices and needle-removers with any sharps or needles. As a result, there was a large increase in research, development, and marketing of needle safety devices and needle-remover. In most hospital and medical settings in the U.S., needle safety regulations are maintained through individual needle safety devices and needle disposal boxes.

== Existing solutions ==
One of the most common causes of needle-stick injuries, which the Needlestick Act and Bloodborne Pathogens Standard were attempting to decrease, was two-handed recapping. As a result, a one-handed capping mechanism was added to insulin and tuberculin syringes. The cap is attached to the syringe via a hinge, which allows the cap to be snapped onto the needle using one hand. The disadvantage to the hinge system is that the cap can get caught by jewelry and clothing, can get bumped when used, and the fixed position can be a hindrance during low angle injection. So Becton Dickinson (BD) has recently come out with a variation on this safety: instead of a hinge, the device slides over the needle and fully covers the tip of the needle, so accidental needle-sticks do not occur.

However, the rest of the world does not have similar needle and syringe regulations. For instance, the WHO is only able to regulate vaccinations in developing countries by ensuring that all vaccination syringes sent to these countries have autodisable features, since the major concern is the reuse of contaminated needles and syringes. These autodisable features allow the syringes to only be used once, so they cannot be reused. These mechanisms could be teeth that interlock to prevent the plunger from being pulled back for another use or a bag prefilled with the vaccine to stop reuse. For example, the SoloShot has a metal clip that locks the plunger down after one use. The BD Uniject is a prefilled vaccine syringe that uses a plastic bulb instead of a plunger and has a disc valve to prevent reuse. Still, over 90% of syringes worldwide do not have autodisable features. Individual protection devices are expensive, and regular needles are much more prevalent. Consequently, many developing world countries use needle-removers to reduce the risk of disease transmission via these exposed.

== Benefits of needle-removers ==
Needle-removers minimize the occurrence of accidental needle-sticks because they allow immediate removal and containment of the needles, especially if the device is near the area of use. Reuse of syringes is prevented because the needle-remover physically separates the needle from the syringe, making the syringe useless. They also improve waste disposal by decreasing both the amount of infectious waste and the amount of safety boxes needed for the waste, since safety boxes can pack syringes 20-60% more compactly without the needles. Additionally, these devices are cost-efficient since one device can handle several hundred needles. Many developing world countries do not have the resources to afford auto-disable syringes, so with needle-removers, the hospitals can continue to use cheap syringes, while only paying a one-time fee to buy a needle-remover that has a life-span of about 200-500 needles.

== Social and ethical implications ==
A significant ethical issue for the project is whether or not the needle-remover will cause more harm than its potential benefits. Engineers are obliged to use their skills and knowledge to improve the safety, health, and welfare of the public. The main concern is for the operator of the device; no engineer should create a device that could injure the operator. Another concern is that children may gain access to the device and accidentally hurt themselves. If a device design could potentially cause either of these problems, the team would be ethically obligated to reexamine that design, and it would either have to be improved or abandoned. When the device functions effectively and safely, it will serve to protect the welfare of the community. In developing countries, the risk of disease transmission is elevated due to the high percentage of needle-stick injuries, which is a result of inadequate needle collection devices. Increased pathogen transmission also occurs from the reuse of contaminated needles when supplies are low. The device will prevent reuse of needles and facilitate needle collection and disposal, and thus will improve the health and safety of hospital workers and the community.

The social and economic effects of the device also need to be recognized. In developing countries, the lack of proper needle collection devices leads to an increase in the number of occupational needle-sticks by health care workers via contaminated needles. Occupational needle-sticks account for 40%-65% of Hepatitis B and C infections in health care workers. As a result, more health care workers have to undergo post-exposure testing and treatment, both of which cost money for the hospitals and the countries. There is also the manpower cost associated with losing trained health care workers to infections acquired on the job. With fewer than 10 doctors for every 100,000 individuals in sub-Saharan nations, any loss of hospital staff puts a strain of hospital resources. In addition, developing countries have made significant investments in training their health care workers, which is lost when occupational needle-sticks cause health care workers to leave the medical field.

The economic considerations are not just limited to costs associated with health care workers. Due to the high cost of needle-disposal containers and the fact that the containers usually have to be shipped overseas, unsafe and dangerous substitutes are used instead. This practice can potentially lead to needle-sticks by health care workers and individuals in the community, as well as needle reuse by members of the community, which can increase the potential spread of diseases.

== Possible designs ==
The easiest needle-removers to operate are electrically powered, and either melt the needle or cut the needles at multiple sections. One patented design involves a syringe falling down into a chamber where powered movable blades advance the syringe onto fixed blades on the opposite side, at which point the syringe is cut with a shearing motion at multiple points. There are other patents that use electricity between electrodes or between rotating gears to short-circuit the needle and melt it off the syringe. A more complex design involves a hammer mill and grinder to break up and grind up the plastic and metal parts of the syringes, after which, the pieces are heated and cooled. The end result is metal particles encapsulated in a piece of plastic.

However, electricity in developing countries is not a dependable source, so hand-powered needle-cutters would be preferred. Some designs use the squeezing force from a hand to force one or two blades to shear across each other and hence cut the needle between the blades. There are other designs in which a twisting motion brings a shearing blade in contact with the needle and thus cuts it. Another design has a stationary outer surface that the syringe body rests against and a cylindrical inner cutting body with a bore for the needle to pass through. A lever rotates the inner body, which shears the needle from the syringe and dumps the needle into a container. A crank system can be used to power a similar design, which also uses a cylindrical inner body. However instead of cutting the needle, the device pulls the needle completely out of the syringe, which deforms the needle, and dumps it into a container. A more complicated design actually pulls the needle and collar from the barrel of the syringe without a rotational motion: the downward motion of putting the syringe into the device powers two arms to pull the needle off the syringe. The interesting aspect of this device is that it appears to be one-handed. Another one-handed device uses a downward motion to cause rotating gears to unscrew the needle and collar from the syringe. This design is very complex to implement, so an improvement of this design involves pegs that grip and rotate the needle collar instead of gears. The downward force is transferred into moving the pegs in helical slots, which causes the collar to rotate and the needle to be removed from the syringe.

In 2006 a cheap and simple solution utilizing old cola or beer cans to dispose needles and specially developed lid to safely seal them was designed by Yellowone and given the name Antivirus. The lid snaps onto the top of the can permanently sealing it without using any glue or tools. The ’collar’ of the cap is protecting the user during the needle separation process. The insertion hole is designed to separate needle and syringe at the point of use. No finger can pass through the opening. Each can securely contains 150-200 used needles (Yellowone).

== Commercial models ==
There are several electrically powered needle-removers on the market now. The Disintegrator Needle Destruction Device, offered by American Scientific Resources (ASFX), uses plasma arc technology to destroy the needle, kill pathogens and blunt the syringe. Designed to be used with only one hand, this device completely eliminates the sharp. One model from Techno Fab uses a regular electrical short-circuit to melt the needle, while another needle-remover, seen at CarePathways.com, uses a plasma arc to melt the needle. A unique needle-remover design is the Needle Remover Device, designed by the Program for Appropriate Technology in Health (PATH). It uses two handles that are squeezed together to slide two circular blades across each other, which cuts the hub from the syringe. It is also reusable, and its target cost is about $15. Another needle-removers currently on the market is Advanced Care Products's Clip&Stor, which uses a hand-powered clipper action to remove the needle. The cost of the Clip&Stor is about seven dollars. There is also the BD Hub Cutter, which uses a squeezing hand motion to cut the syringe. The edges of the squeezable parts have blades that do the actual cutting. However, unlike a regular needle-remover, the BD Hub Cutter cuts the syringe at the hub so the needle is completely separated from the syringe. As a result, the risk of a contaminated puncture is completely eliminated because no needle shards remain on the syringe. The Hub Cutter is not reusable though, and disposal of the whole unit must occur. The cost of the Hub Cutter is about four dollars.

== Limitations ==
Most of these current needle-removers require the use of two hands; one to hold the needle in place and the other to activate the mechanism. This form of operation can cause problems because if hospital personnel are busy, especially in a developing world country, they may not have the time or hands needed to operate the device. As a result, the needle will remain exposed on the syringe, posing a risk to both health care workers and patients.

Furthermore, many of these existing needle-removers do not make use of cheap and readily available materials, like used motor oil jugs, for containers, which raises the price of the device and requires that the hospital continuously buys more containers from the company. A typical 3-gallon Bemis sharps container with a rotating lid costs about $8 without including shipping costs. If these containers must be shipped overseas, the price of the device can far exceed the available resources of many hospitals in developing countries, which causes them not to buy needle-remover.

== See also ==
- Occupational Safety and Health Administration
- Hypodermic needle
- Injection (medicine)
- International Council of Nurses
- Biomedical technology
- Biomedical engineering
- Needle-exchange programme
