= Peggy Ferro =

American activist (1949–1998)

- Born: March 19, 1949; Brooklyn, New York
- Died: November 4, 1998 (aged 49); San Francisco, California
- Other name: Peggy Ferro Guinto
- Occupations: Activist, healthcare worker

Margaret Frances "Peggy" Ferro (March 19, 1949 – November 4, 1998) was an American healthcare activist and nurse's aide. Her efforts led to laws requiring the use of safety syringes in hospitals and other medical settings.

== Early life ==
Ferro was born in Brooklyn, New York, and raised on Staten Island.

== Career ==
Ferro worked in hospitals in San Francisco in the early 1980s, and fought to open an AIDS ward in one hospital. She was active in the Hospital and Institutional Workers Union. She was a nurse's aide in 1990, when she received a needlestick injury while clearing a table in an emergency room. She learned two months later that she was HIV-positive. She worked for changes in the law to require hospitals to use safety needles to prevent similar injuries in others. In a 1992 Congressional hearing she used the pseudonym "Jean Roe", because of the stigma associated with her HIV status. She cooperated in making two videos, The Real Jane Roe, about her experiences, and a training video for nurses about needle safety.

Ferro started a support group for HIV-positive women. "Peggy wanted to make sure women with AIDS were not invisible," her partner Cindy Chang told the Bay Area Reporter in 1998.

The law she lobbied to create was passed in California shortly before her death, and went into effect in July 1999. At the federal level, the Needlestick Safety and Prevention Act became a national law in 2000.

== Personal life ==
Ferro was briefly married in the 1980s. Ferro died from AIDS in San Francisco in 1998, at the age of 49, survived by her partner Cindy Chang. "Her reputation was far-reaching, and her situation was tragic," commented Assemblywoman Carole Migden.
