= Safety syringe =

Medical syringe with a built-in safety mechanism

A safety syringe is a syringe with a built-in safety mechanism to reduce the risk of needlestick injuries to healthcare workers and others. The needle on a safety syringe can be detachable or permanently attached. On some models, a sheath is placed over the needle, whereas in others the needle retracts into the barrel. Safety needles serve the same functions as safety syringes, but the protective mechanism is a part of the needle rather than the syringe. Legislation requiring safety syringes or equivalents has been introduced in many nations since needlestick injuries and re-use prevention became the focus of governments and safety bodies.

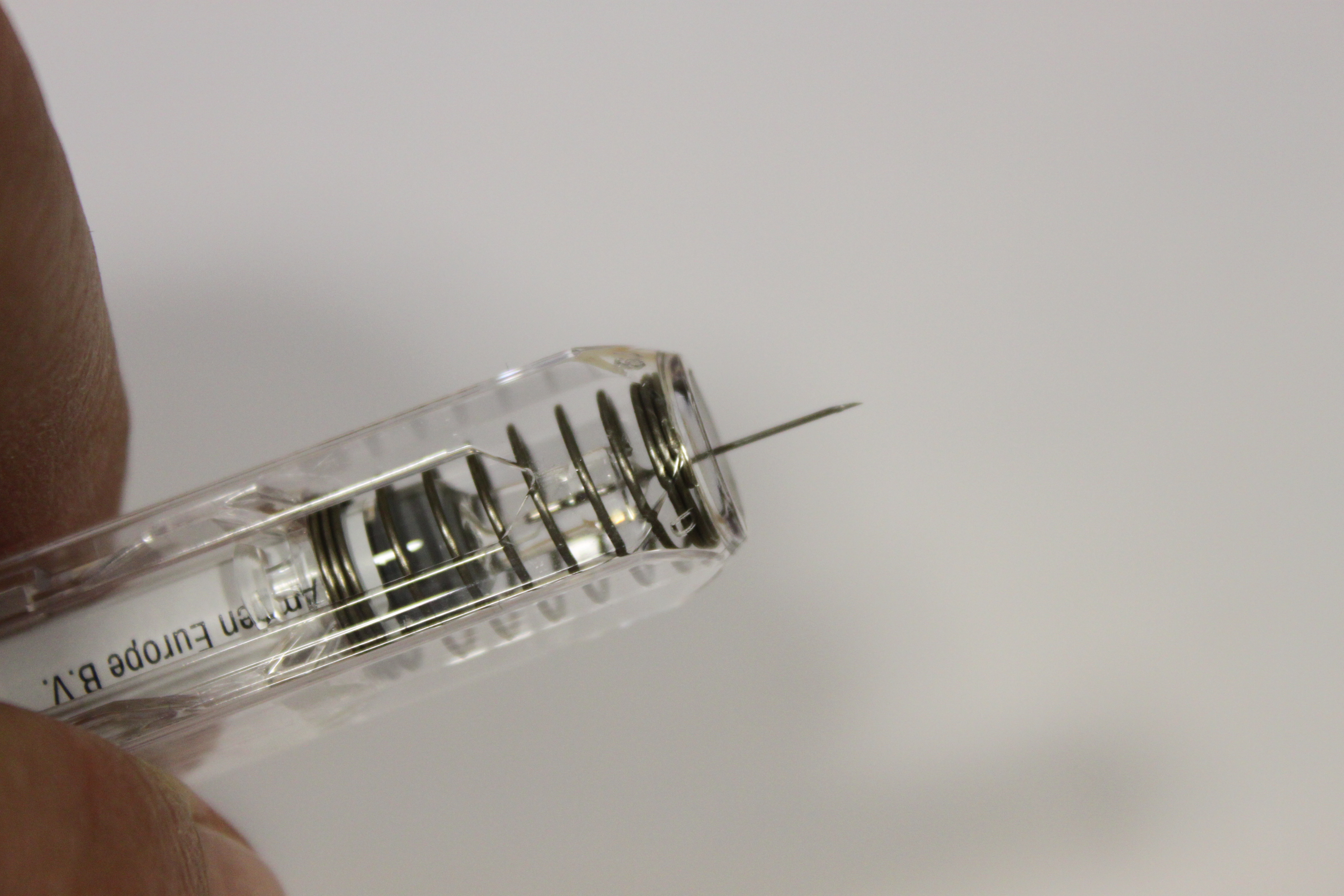
In this model of safety syringe, the needle retracts into the barrel of the syringe after use.

== Types ==
There are many types of safety syringes available on the market. Auto Disable (AD) syringes are designed as a single use syringe, with an internal mechanism blocking the barrel once depressed so it cannot be depressed again. The other type of syringe with a re-use prevention feature is the breaking plunger syringe. An internal mechanism cracks the syringe when the plunger is fully depressed to prevent further use. These syringes are only effectively disabled with a full depression of the plunger; users can avoid activating the re-use prevention feature and re-use the syringe.

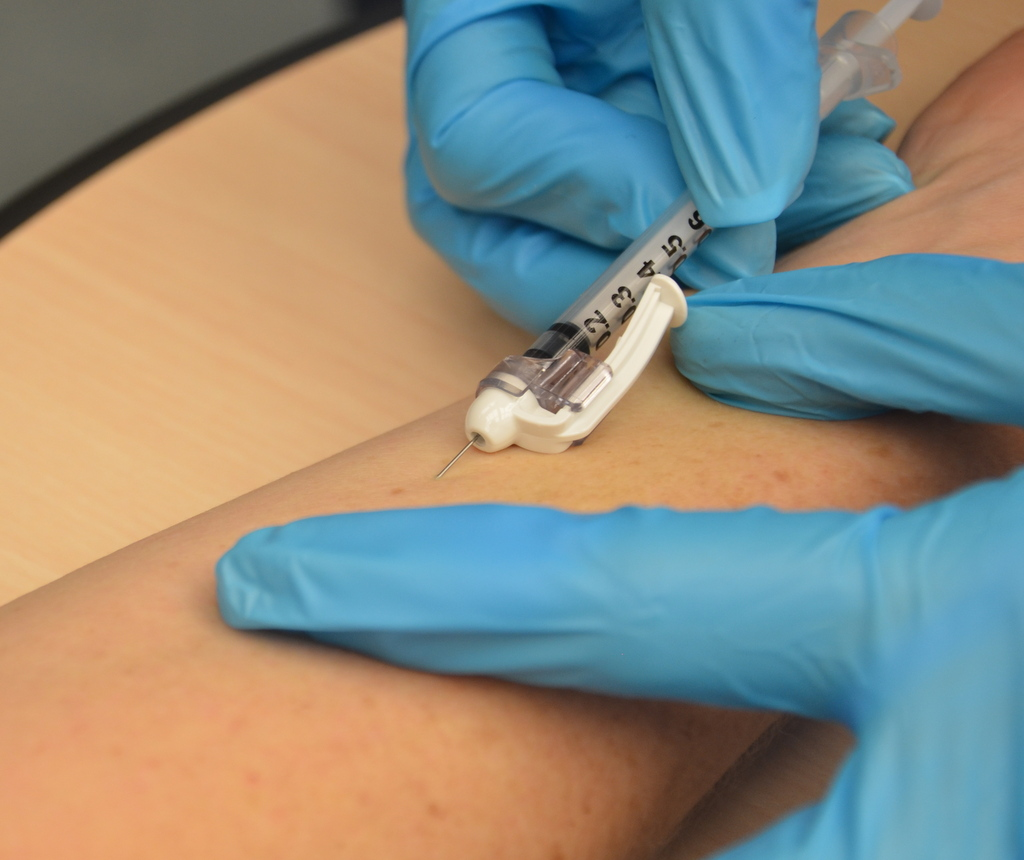
This syringe has a sliding needle guard

The more effective safety syringes have reuse and needlestick prevention features. A sheath or hood slides over the needle after the injection is completed with a Needlestick Prevention Syringe, which also has a re-use prevention feature (either an auto disable mechanism or breaking plunger). Retractable syringes use either manual or spring-loaded retraction to withdraw the needle into the barrel of the syringe. Some brands of spring-loaded syringes can have a splatter effect, where blood and fluids are sprayed off the cannula from the force of the retraction. Manual retraction syringes are generally easier to depress because there is no resistance from a spring.

One model of safety syringe with deployable needle guard

== Alternatives ==
Traditional glass syringes can be re-used once disinfected. Plastic body syringes have become more popular in recent years because they are disposable. Unfortunately, improper disposal methods and re-use are responsible for transferring blood borne diseases. This issue arises often by accident due to medications being mixed or switched out with others. Data is collected through "Patient Notification" events whereby organizations inform patients of possible exposure. These organizations then offer bloodborne pathogen testing to affected individuals.

== Importance ==
Of the 55 cases documented by the CDC of (non-sex work) occupational transmission of HIV, 90% were from contaminated needles that pierced the skin. The direct cost of needlestick injuries was calculated in a recent study to be between $539 and $672 million US dollars. That includes only lab tests, treatment, service and "other"; it does not take into account lost time and wages for employers and individuals.

== Legislation ==
=== United States ===
- Needlestick Safety and Prevention Act, effective date 2001

Two lawyers, Mike Weiss and Paul Danzinger, were approached in 1998 by an inventor, Thomas Shaw, who was having trouble selling a safety syringe developed to protect health care workers from accidentally being infected by dirty needles. The problems were due to monopolistic actions of a major industry needle maker and hospital group purchasing organizations. The case was settled before trial for $150 million. This was portrayed by the 2011 movie Puncture. Shaw's attempts to get his retractable needle accepted by health care facilities were covered in a 2010 Washington Monthly article.

=== Canada ===
- Health Canada Laboratory Biosafety Guidelines
- Provincial Legislation:
  - British Columbia
  - Alberta
  - Manitoba
  - Saskatchewan
  - Ontario
  - Nova Scotia

=== Australia ===
- No nationwide legislation is in place, but suggested practices or policies have been implemented in New South Wales, Victoria, and Queensland.
  - New South Wales uses a set of guidelines called "Blood and Body Substances Occupational Exposure Prevention" which was revised in 2024. This guideline details best practices for prevention against needlestick injuries for those working in the healthcare field. It Was made in response to the "Worker Health and Safety Act of 2011" and the "Worker Health and Safety Regulation 2017".
  - Victoria uses a set of guidelines to provide instruction for workplace safety regarding needles and sharps. It elaborates on exposure protocols, evaluation and testing of the source, and management methods for immediate and follow-up actions to be taken.
  - Queensland has guidance for blood and body fluid exposure. This details chief responsibilities, first aid, risk assessment, testing, among other topics regarding bloodborne pathogen exposure and management. Unlike the guidance from the other states, Queensland has more information regarding neonatal and pediatric considerations.

=== Europe ===
- The European Union has some regulations on this subject. One of these regulations is that of "Conformity Assessments". These are tests conducted by "Notified bodies" and approved by the EU to evaluate performance and safety of the product. Depending on the specific device used, it may be considered a "High Risk" device. If a device is deemed "High Risk", then an additional panel of experts will be needed in the approval process.

== Sharps Containers ==
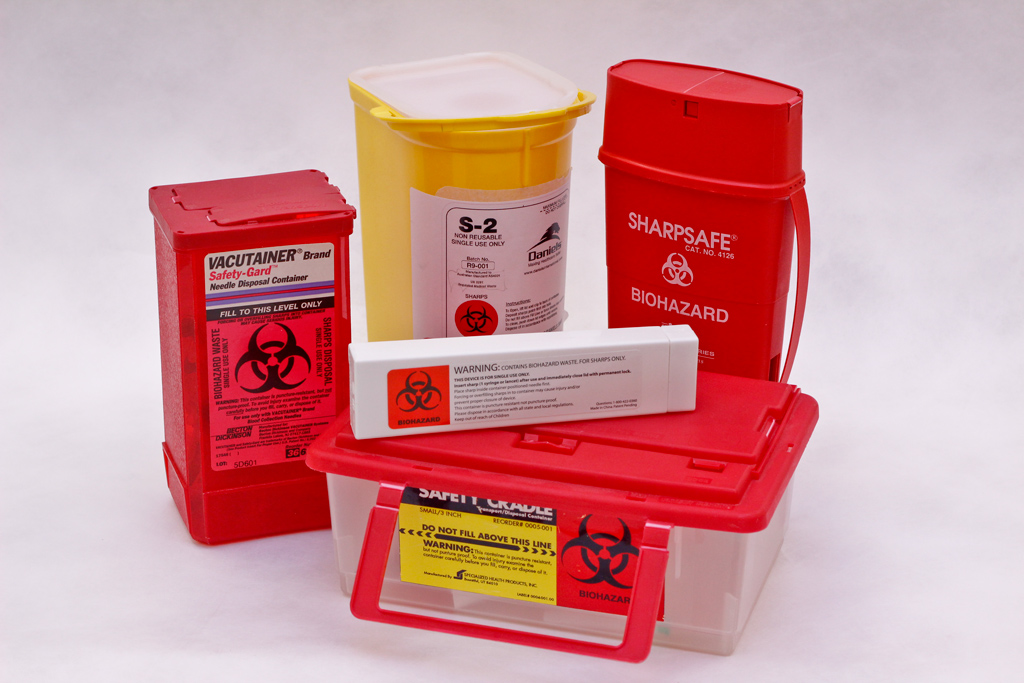
An image of a sharps container.

Sharps containers are devices used to collect small, sharp objects safely. The purpose of this is to properly dispose of contaminated items to limit exposure to workers nearby. These items often include needles, lancets, suture needles, and scalpels. These containers can collect broken glass for general disposal. However, general broken glass and needles potentially containing bloodborne pathogens should not be mixed and must be disposed of separately.

The Occupational Safety and Health Administration requires that sharps containers be placed "Easily accessible to personnel and located as close as is feasible to the immediate area where sharps are used or can be reasonably anticipated to be found." (1910.1030(d)(4)(iii)(A)(2)(i) This ensures that the containers are kept close to where syringes, needles, and other (often medical) sharps devices are used. By doing this, proper and safe disposal practices are adhered to.

The standard additionally references secondary containers, which are devices used to contain leakage or spillage. Oftentimes sharps placed in these containers still have small amounts of chemicals and medicines stored within them, posing a health and safety risk to workers if exposed. This leftover material is often known as "Dead Space".

== Disinfection/Decontamination ==
The decontamination process varies depending on the products and processes used. Many products, particularly sprays and aerosols, have a "contact time". The contact time is "...the time the product must be applied to the surface for it to be effective." This ensures that the chemicals has adequately removed or killed the contaminant. These chemicals are often designed to protect against HIV, Hepatitis B, and Hepatitis C. The EPA has a list of approved safe chemicals that can be used, each with different bloodborne pathogens they protect against. The efficacy of these chemicals is verified by OCSPP 810.2200.

== See also ==
- Infection control
- Peggy Ferro
- Blood-borne disease
- Sharps waste
