= Sharps waste =

Form of biomedical waste

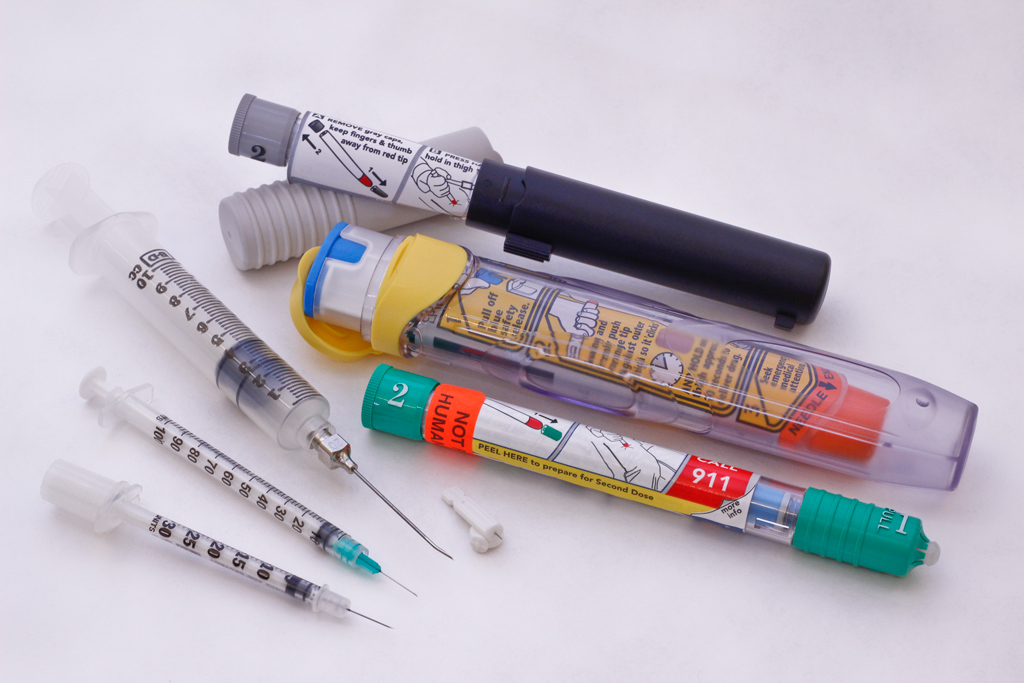
Sharps – like needles, syringes, lancets and other devices used at home to treat diabetes, arthritis, cancer, and other diseases – should be immediately disposed of after use.

Sharps waste is a form of biomedical waste composed of used "sharps", which includes any device or object used to puncture or lacerate the skin. Sharps waste is classified as biohazardous waste and must be carefully handled. Common medical materials treated as sharps waste are hypodermic needles, disposable scalpels and blades, contaminated glass and certain plastics, and guidewires used in surgery.

== Qualifying materials ==
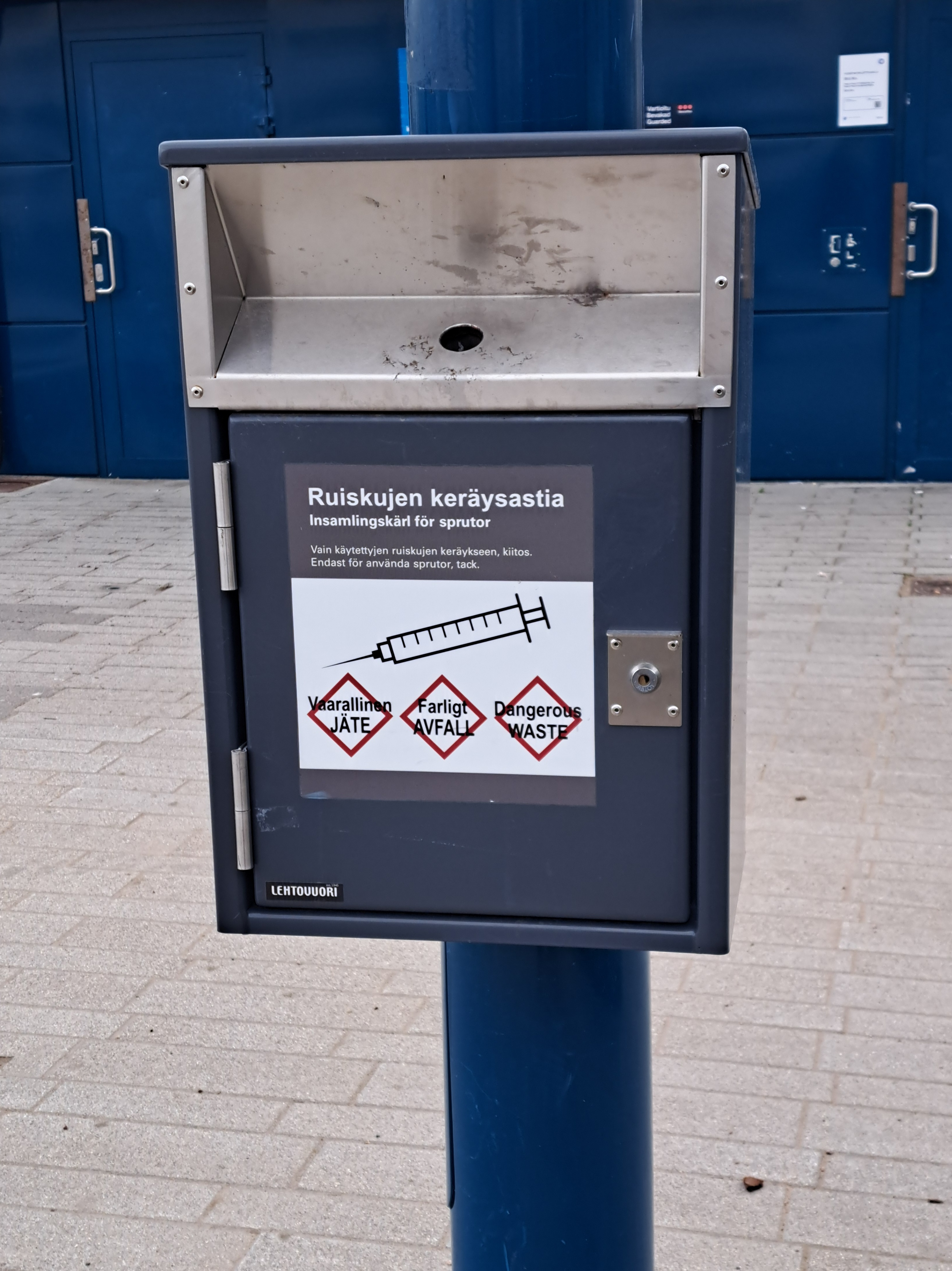
A community sharps bin in Mannerheim Park, Oulu, Finland. 2025

In addition to needles and blades, anything attached to them, such as syringes and injection devices, is also considered sharps waste.

Blades can include razors, scalpels, X-Acto knives, scissors, or any other items used for cutting in a medical or biological research setting, regardless of whether they have been contaminated with biohazardous material. While glass and sharp plastic are considered sharps waste, their handling methods can vary.

Glass items which have been contaminated with a biohazardous material are treated with the same concern as needles and blades, even if unbroken. If glass is contaminated, it is still often treated as a sharp, because it can break during the disposal process. Contaminated plastic items which are not sharp can be disposed of in a biohazardous waste receptacle instead of a sharps container.

== Dangers involved ==
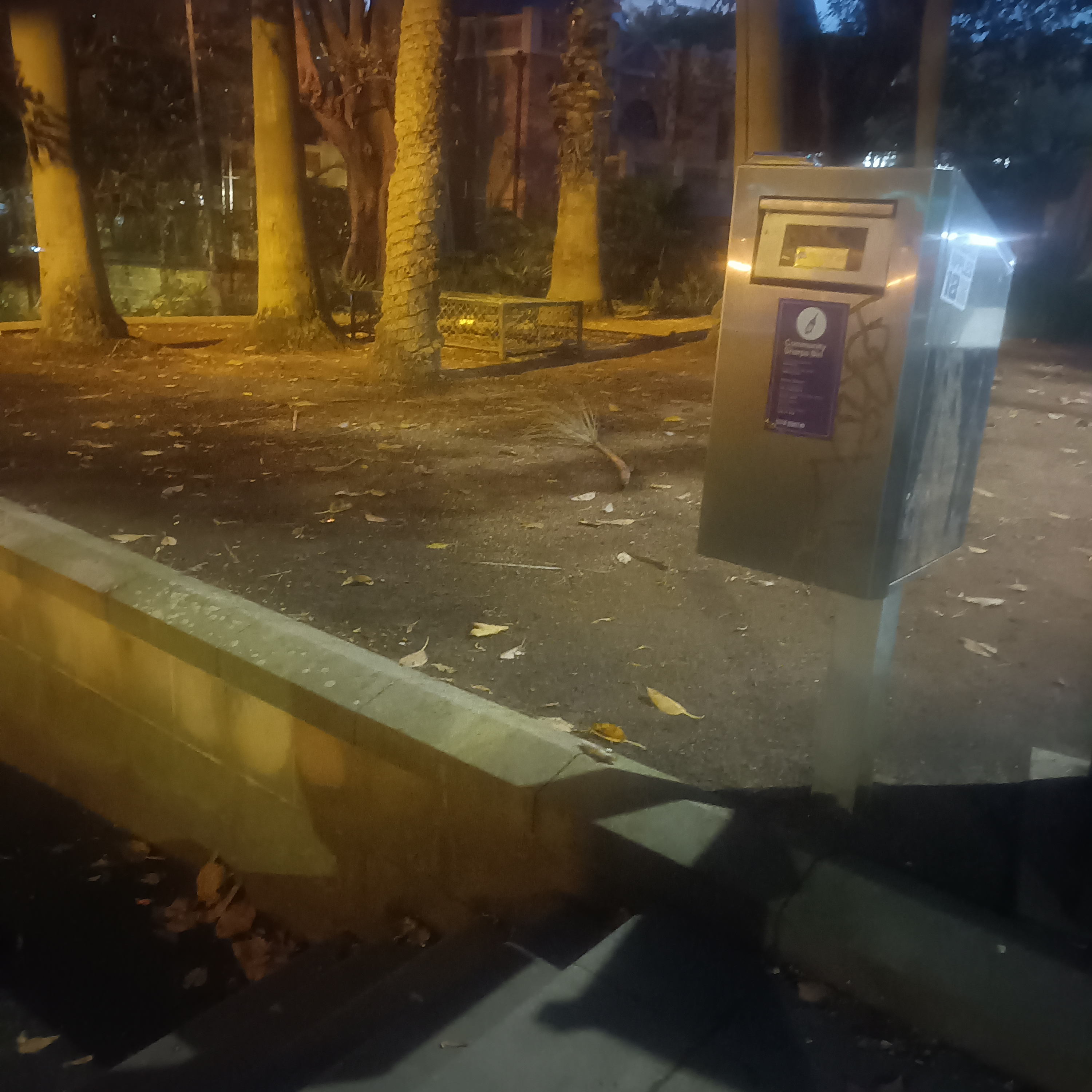
A community sharps bin in Green park, Darlinghurst, Sydney. 2026

Injuries from sharps waste can pose a large public health concern, as used sharps may contain biohazardous material. It is possible for this waste to spread blood-borne pathogens if contaminated sharps penetrate the skin. The spread of these pathogens is directly responsible for the transmission of blood-borne diseases, such as hepatitis B (HBV), hepatitis C (HCV), and HIV. Health care professionals expose themselves to the risk of transmission of these diseases when handling sharps waste. The large volume handled by health care professionals on a daily basis increases the chance that an injury may occur.

The general public can occasionally be at risk of sustaining injuries from sharps waste as well when hypodermic needles are improperly disposed of by injection drug users.

== Sharps containers ==
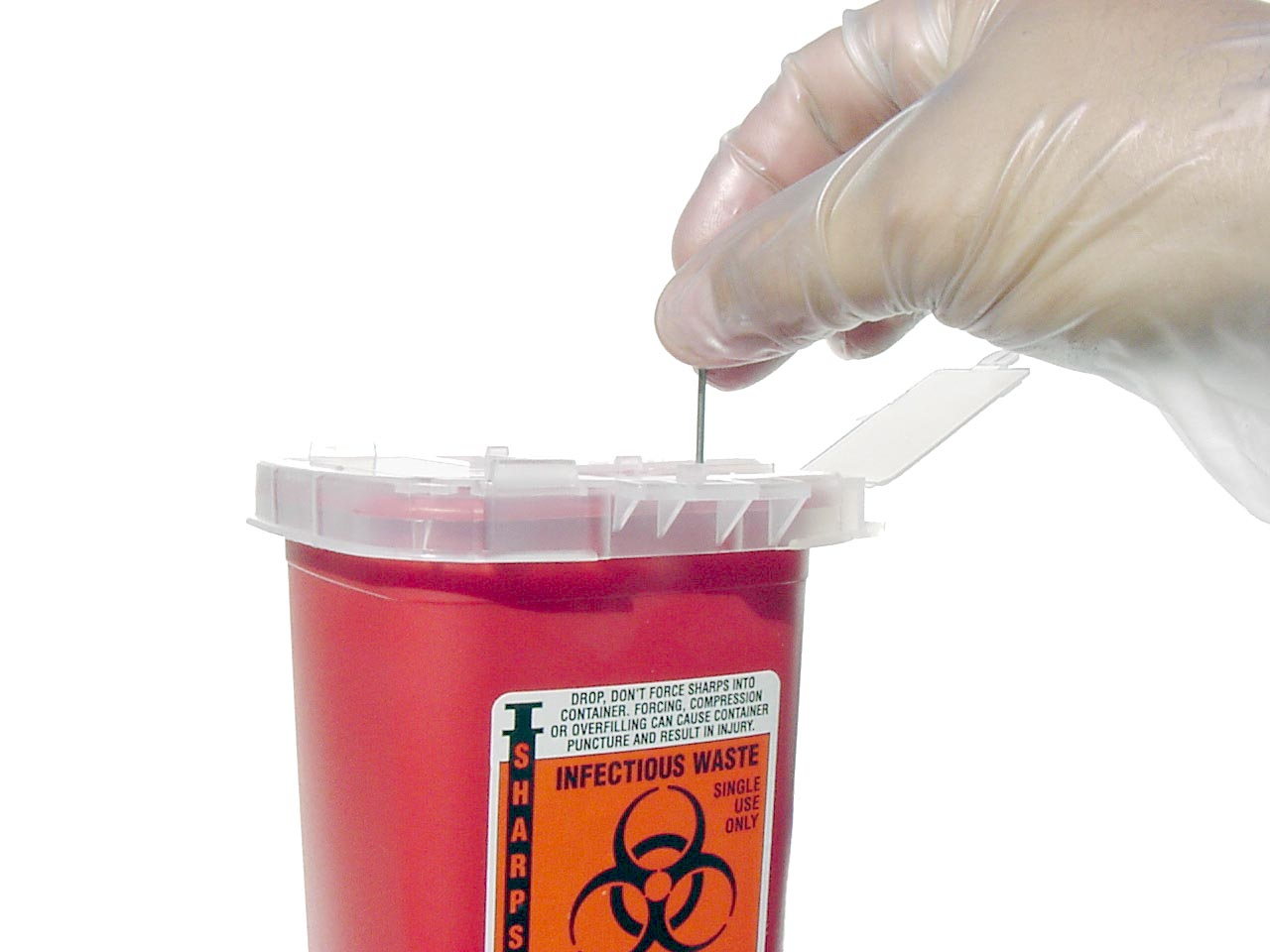
A sharps container with the biohazard symbol (☣) is specially designed for safe disposal of sharps waste

Hard plastic containers known as sharps containers are used to safely dispose of hypodermic needles and other sharp medical instruments, such as IV catheters and disposable scalpels. They are often sealable and self-locking, as well as rigid, which prevents waste from penetrating or damaging the sides of the container. In the United States, sharps containers are usually red and marked with the universal biohazard symbol for ease of recognition. Elsewhere, they are often yellow. Waste is loaded into the container until it reaches a certain height, which is usually around three-quarters of the way full. At that point, the container is emptied or disposed of.

Sharps containers may be single use, in which case they are disposed of along with the waste they contain, or reusable, in which case they are robotically emptied and sterilized before being returned for re-use. Airports and large institutions commonly have sharps containers available in restrooms for safe disposal for users of injection drugs, such as insulin-dependent diabetics. Medical facilities and laboratories are also equipped with sharps containers, as well as the equipment required to safely sterilize or dispose of them. This minimizes the distance the containers have to travel and the number of people to come in contact with the sharps waste. Smaller clinics or offices in the US without such facilities are required by federal regulations to hire the services of a company that specializes in transporting and properly disposing of the hazardous wastes.

== Disposal ==
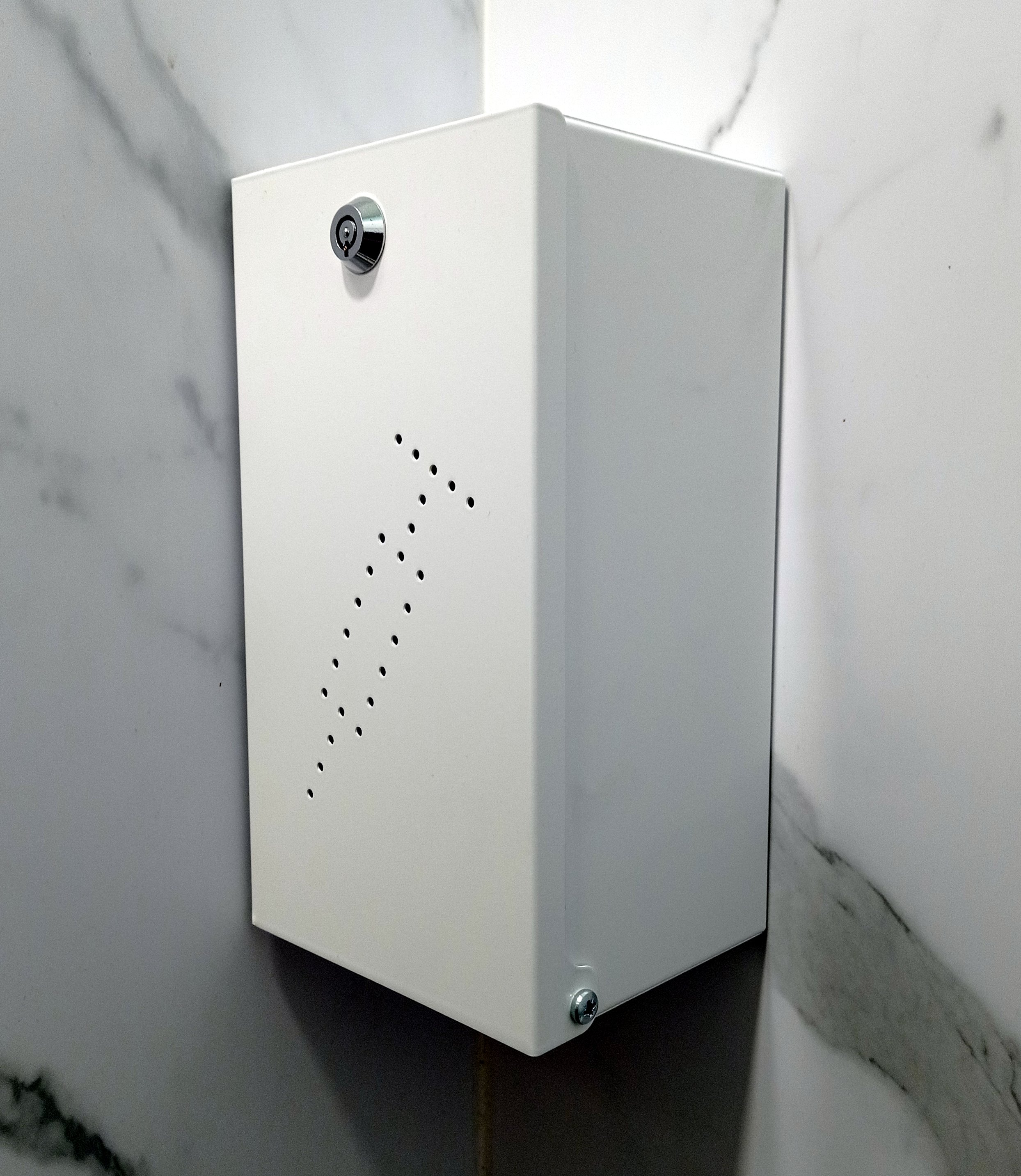
A needle bin in a cubicle at the public toilets in a north London shopping centre. 2024

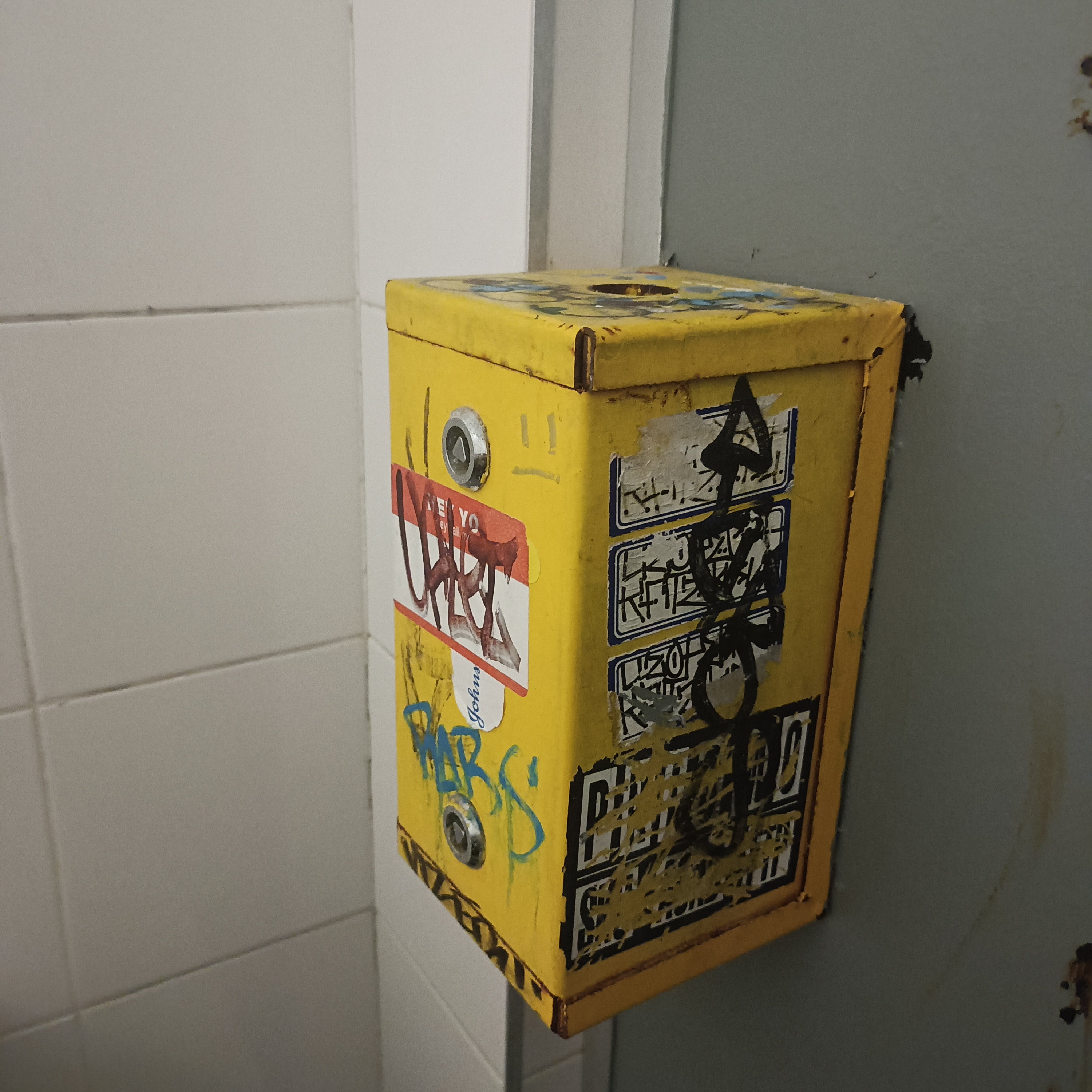
A sharps disposal bin in a public toilet in Sydney. 2026

Extreme care must be taken in the management and disposal of sharps waste. The goal in sharps waste management is to safely handle all materials until they can be properly disposed of. The final step in the disposal of sharps waste is to dispose of them in an autoclave. A less common approach is to incinerate them; typically only chemotherapy sharps waste is incinerated. Steps must be taken along the way to minimize the risk of injury from this material, while maximizing the amount of sharps material disposed of. Strict hospital protocols and government regulations that instruct health care providers on how to manage sharps waste help ensure that the waste is handled as effectively and safely as possible.

Disposal methods vary by country and locale, but common methods of disposal are either by truck service or, in the United States, by disposal of sharps through the mail. Truck service involves trained personnel collecting sharps waste, and often medical waste, at the point of generation, and hauling it away by truck to a destruction facility. Similarly, the mail-back sharps disposal method allows generators to ship sharps waste to the disposal facility directly through the U.S. mail in specially designed and approved shipping containers. Mail-back sharps disposal allows waste generators to dispose of smaller amounts of sharps more economically than if they were to hire out a truck service. Recent legislation in France has stated that pharmaceutical companies supplying self injection medications are responsible for the disposal of spent needles. Previously popular needle clippers and caps are no longer acceptable as safety devices, and either sharps box or needle destruction devices are required.

A report by the Canadian Mental Health Association found that supervised injection sites help reduce the amount of discarded needles on streets.

== Injection technology ==
With more than sixteen billion injections administered annually worldwide, needles are the largest contributor to sharps waste. For this reason, many new technologies surrounding injections have been developed, mostly related to safety mechanisms. As these technologies have been developed, governments have attempted to make them commonplace to ensure sharps waste safety. In 2000, the Needlestick Safety and Prevention Act was passed, along with the 2001 Bloodborne Pathogens Standard.

Safety syringes help reduce occurrences of accidental needlesticks. One of the most recent developments has been the auto-disable injection device. These injection devices automatically disable after a single use. This can be done by retracting the needle back into the syringe or rendering the syringe plunger inoperable. With the injection device now inoperable, it cannot be reused. Shielding the needle after the injection is another approach for safe management of sharps. These are hands free methods usually involving a hinging cap that can be pressed on a table to seal the needle. Another technology in sharps waste management relating to injections is the needle remover. Varying approaches can be taken with the main goal to separate the needle from the syringe. This allows the sharp needle to be quarantined and disposed of separately from the syringe. There is debate around the use of these devices, as they involve an additional step in the handling of sharps waste.

== In the developing world ==
Sharps waste is of great concern in developing and transitional regions of the world. Factors such as high disease prevalence and lack of health care professionals amplify the dangers involved with sharps waste, and the cost of newer disposal technology makes them unlikely to be used.

As with the rest of the world, injection waste make up the largest portion of sharps waste. However, injection use is much more prevalent in the developing world. One of the contributors to this increase is a larger emphasis placed on injections for therapeutic purposes. It has been estimated that 95% of all injections in developing regions are for therapeutic purposes. The average person has been estimated to receive 1.5 injections per year. Newly developed injection technologies are rarely used to provide these injections due to added costs. Therefore, the majority of injections are given with standard disposable syringes in developing regions.

The infrastructure of developing regions is not equipped to deal with this large volume of contaminated sharps waste. Contrary to the industrialized world, disposal incinerators and transportation networks are not always available. Cost restraints make the purchase of single use disposable containers unrealistic. Facilities are often overwhelmed with patients and understaffed with educated workers. Demand on these facilities can limit the emphasis or enforcement of waste disposal protocols. These factors leave a dangerous quantity of sharps waste in the environment. Contrasts between the industrialized and developing world segment can be seen in accidental needle stick injuries. These occur at a rate of .18 to .74 per person per year in industrialized nations and .93 to 4.68 per person per year in developing and transitional nations (Hutin, Hauri, Armstrong, 2003).

Improper sharps management is a major factor involved in what is categorized as unsafe injections. In 2000, these were estimated to account for 21 million, 2 million, and 260,000 of new HBV, HCV, and HIV infections annually. 40-65% of new HBV and HCV infections are due to percutaneous occupational exposure.
