= Pathogen reduction using riboflavin and UV light =

Pathogen reduction using riboflavin and UV light is a method by which infectious pathogens in blood for transfusion are inactivated by adding riboflavin and irradiating with UV light. This method reduces the infectious levels of disease-causing agents that may be found in donated blood components, while still maintaining good quality blood components for transfusion. This type of approach to increase blood safety is also known as “pathogen inactivation” in the industry.

Despite measures that are in place in the developed world to ensure the safety of blood products for transfusion, a risk of disease transmission still exists. Consequently, the development of pathogen inactivation/reduction technologies for blood products has been an ongoing effort in the field of transfusion medicine. A new procedure for the treatment of individual units of single-donor (apheresis) or whole blood–derived, pooled, platelets has recently been introduced. This technology uses riboflavin and light for the treatment of platelets and plasma.

Riboflavin and UV is only one of several ways that have been developed for photodynamic disinfection of blood products. There are also light-independent methods of pathogen reduction in blood products.

== Method ==
This pathogen reduction process involves adding riboflavin (vitamin B2) to the blood component, which is then placed into an illuminator where it is exposed to UV light for about five to ten minutes. Exposure to UV light activates riboflavin and when it is associated with nucleic acids (DNA and RNA), riboflavin causes a chemical alteration to functional groups of the nucleic acids thereby making pathogens unable to replicate. In this way the process prevents viruses, bacteria, parasites and white blood cells, from replicating and causing disease.

UV light + riboflavin → irreversible inactivation

This method using riboflavin and UV light renders pathogens harmless by using a non-mutagenic, non-toxic method. Riboflavin and its photoproducts are already present in the human body and do not need to be removed from blood products prior to transfusion.

== Examples of pathogens inactivated by this method ==
- Viruses – both enveloped and non-enveloped causing: avian flu, chikungunya, CMV, hepatitis A, hepatitis B, hepatitis C, HIV, parvovirus B19 infections, influenza, rabies, and West Nile fever. This adds a level of protection for those receiving the transfusion product against viruses that donors are screened for (and may be at a level too low to be detected- window period) as well as those that they are not screened for at the time of their donation.
- Bacteria – such as: Bacillus cereus, Enterobacter cloacae, Escherichia coli, Klebsiella pneumoniae, Propionibacterium acnes, Serratia marcescens, Staphylococcus aureus, Staphylococcus epidermidis, Streptococcus agalactiae, Streptococcus mitis, Streptococcus pyogenes, and Yersinia enterocolitica.
- Parasites – causing: babesiosis, Chagas disease, leishmaniasis, malaria, and scrub typhus.
- White blood cells – due to the effective inactivation of white blood cells in donated blood products, riboflavin and UV light treatment may be used as an alternative to gamma-irradiation for the prevention of transfusion-associated graft-versus-host disease (TA-GVHD), a serious blood transfusion-related complication.

== Application ==
The riboflavin and UV light method for pathogen reduction of platelets and plasma is in routine use in multiple countries throughout Europe. This same process is currently in development for the treatment of whole blood, resulting in pathogen reduction of the three components (RBCs, platelets and plasma).
