= Skin popping =

Method of administering recreational drugs

Skin popping is a route of administration of street drugs where they are injected or deposited under the skin. It is usually a depot injection, either subcutaneous or intradermal, and not an intramuscular injection. After deposition, the drug then diffuses slowly from the depot into the capillary networks, where it enters circulation. Skin popping is distinct from intravenous injection in that the latter deposits the drug directly into the bloodstream via a vein. Nonetheless, it is included with IV injection in the category of injection drug use because both involve injection, both are often done with the same drugs, and both carry many of the same risks (such as bloodborne disease risks, injection site infection risks, and risk of death from overdose). Higher-potency prescription opioids, such as morphine, fentanyl, or meperidine can be injected subcutaneously, as can cocaine. Skin popping increases the duration of the high one gets from drugs such as cocaine. The sites where skin popping with cocaine has been performed have an area of central pallor surrounded by bruising (ecchymosis). This pattern is due to the vasoconstrictive properties of cocaine acting locally at the injection site with hemorrhage occurring in the surrounding tissue. Skin popping puts one at risk for developing secondary amyloid associated (AA) amyloidosis. Tetanus has also been associated with skin-popping as has botulism.

== Scarring ==
Skin pop scars are a cutaneous condition caused by skin popping.
