= Venipuncture =

Process of obtaining intravenous access

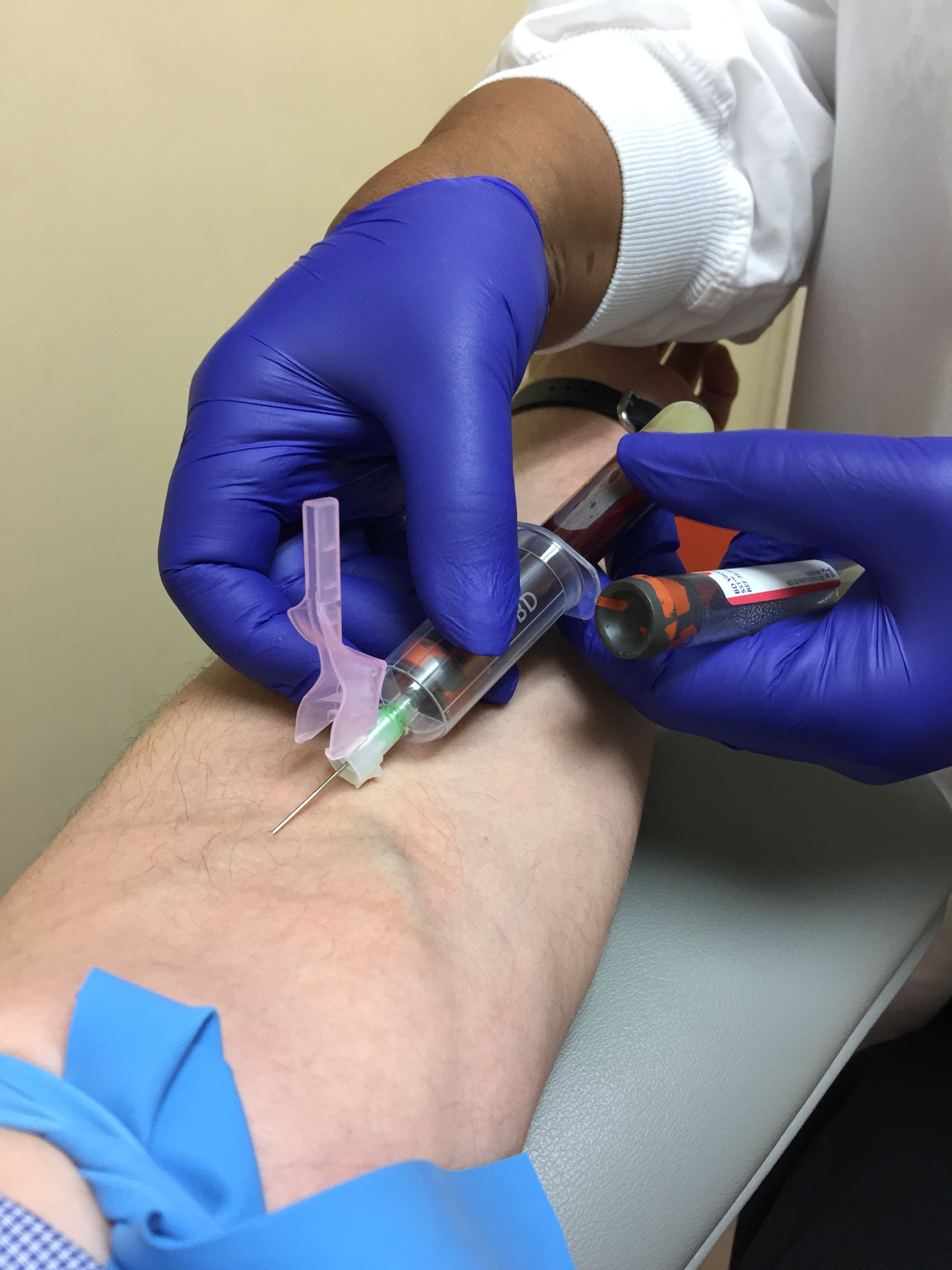
Still photo of a venipuncture procedure

Video of a venipuncture procedure

In medicine, venipuncture or venepuncture is the process of obtaining intravenous access for the purpose of venous blood sampling (also called phlebotomy) or intravenous therapy. In healthcare, this procedure is performed by medical laboratory scientists, medical practitioners, some EMTs, paramedics, phlebotomists, dialysis technicians, and other nursing staff. In veterinary medicine, the procedure is performed by veterinarians and veterinary technicians.

It is essential to follow a standard procedure for the collection of blood specimens to get accurate laboratory results. Any error in collecting the blood or filling the test tubes may lead to erroneous laboratory results.

Venipuncture is one of the most routinely performed invasive procedures and is carried out for any of five reasons:

1. to obtain blood for diagnostic purposes;
2. to monitor levels of blood components;
3. to administer therapeutic treatments including medications, nutrition, or chemotherapy;
4. to remove blood due to excess levels of iron or erythrocytes (red blood cells); or
5. to collect blood for later uses, mainly transfusion either in the donor or in another person.

Blood analysis is an important diagnostic tool available to clinicians within healthcare.

Blood is most commonly obtained from the superficial veins of the upper limb. The median cubital vein, which lies within the cubital fossa anterior to the elbow, is close to the surface of the skin without many large nerves positioned nearby. Other veins that can be used in the cubital fossa for venipuncture include the cephalic, basilic, and median antebrachial veins.

Minute quantities of blood may be taken by fingerstick sampling and collected from infants by means of a heelprick or from scalp veins with a winged infusion needle.

Phlebotomy (incision into a vein) is also the treatment of certain diseases such as hemochromatosis and primary and secondary polycythemia.

== Complications ==
A 1996 study of blood donors (a larger needle is used in blood donation than in routine venipuncture) found that 1 in 6,300 donors sustained a nerve injury.

Among the risks and side effects are dizziness, sweating, or a drop in the patient's heart rate and blood pressure.

== Equipment ==
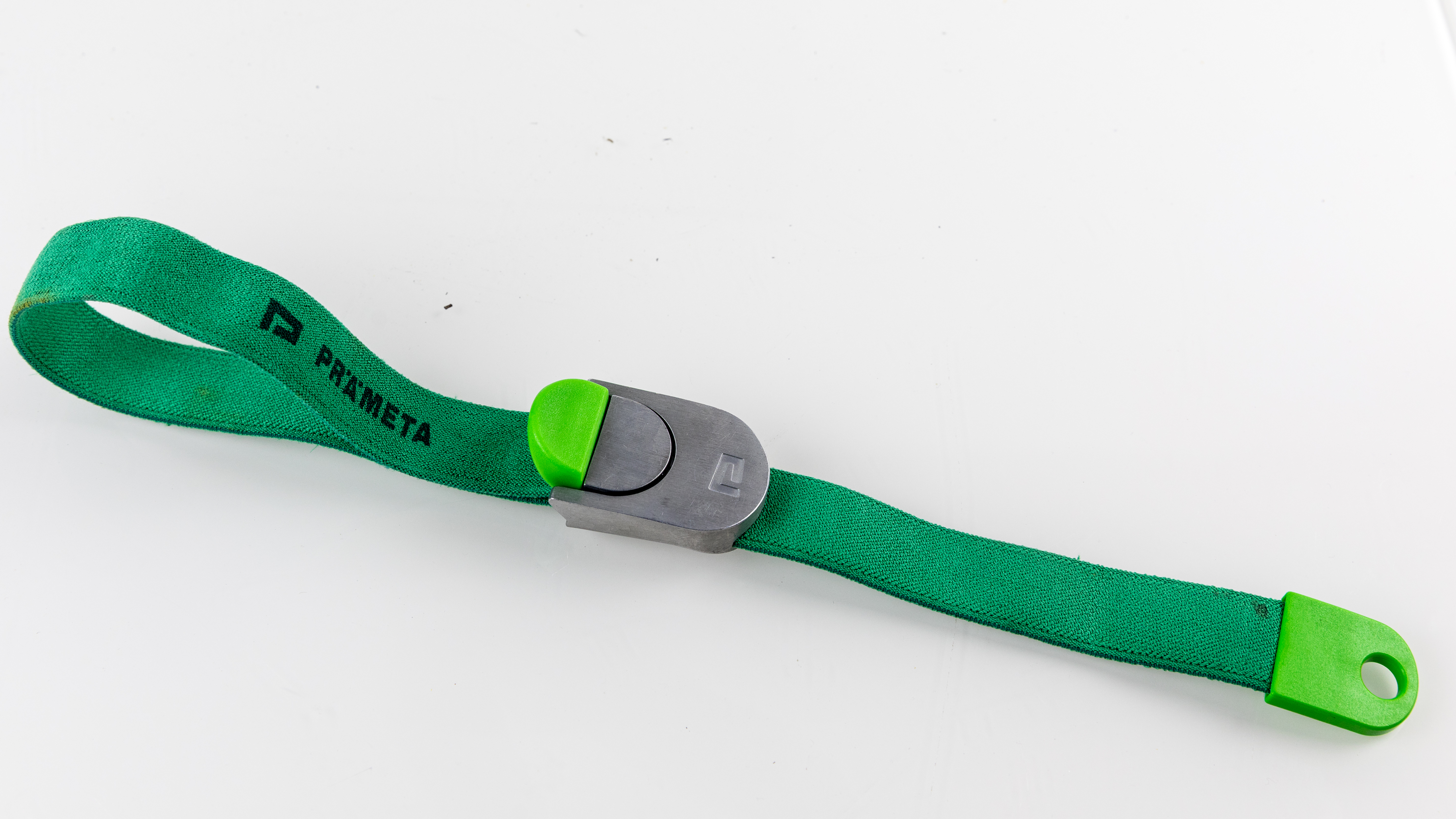
An elastic tourniquet used to temporarily restrict blood flow. The tourniquet distends the veins, making them more palpable and visible.

There are many ways in which blood can be drawn from a vein, and the method used depends on the person's age, the equipment available, and the type of tests required.

Most blood collection in the US, UK, Canada and Hong Kong is done with an evacuated tube system. Two common systems are Vacutainer (Becton, Dickinson and company) and Vacuette (Greiner Bio-One). The equipment consists of a plastic adapter, also known as a tube or needle holder/hub, a hypodermic needle and a vacuum tube. Under certain circumstances, a syringe may be used, often with a butterfly needle, which is a plastic catheter attached to a short needle. In the developing world, the evacuated tube system is the preferred method of drawing blood.

=== With evacuated or vacuum tubes ===
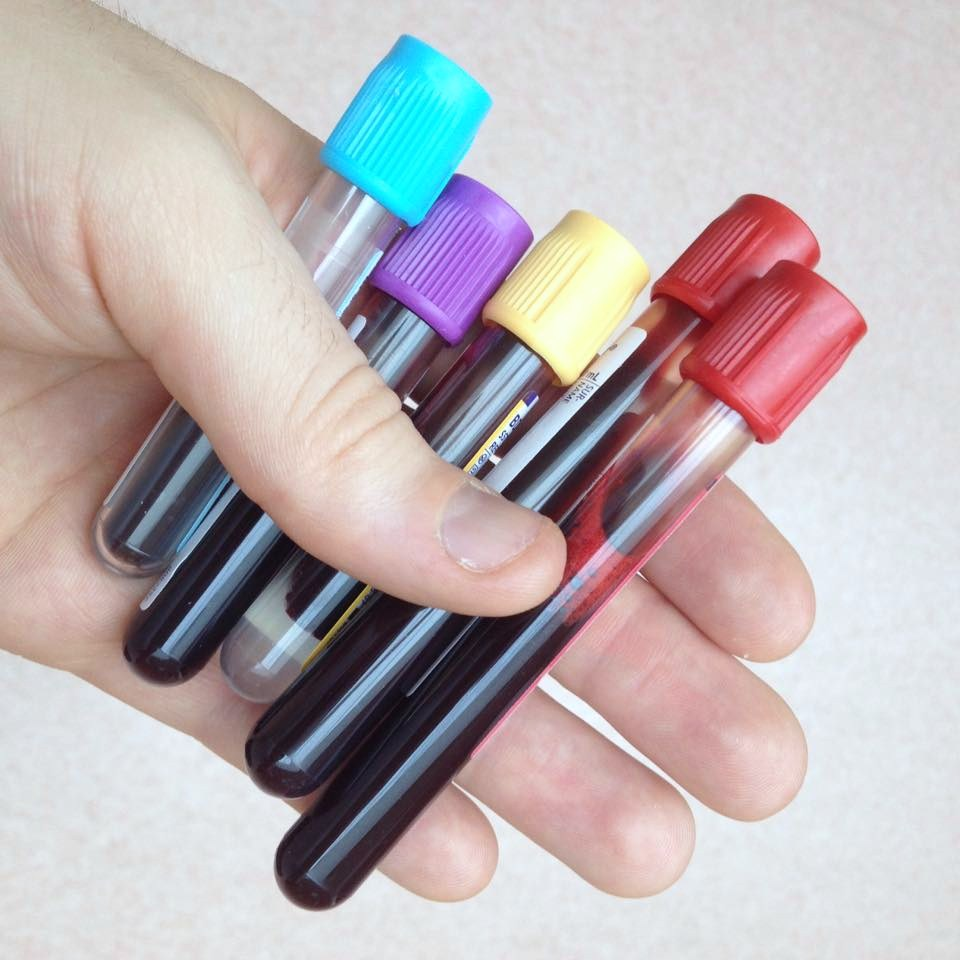
Vacutainer blood vials

Greiner Bio-One manufactured the first ever plastic evacuated blood collection tube in 1985 under the VACUETTE brand name. Today, many companies sell vacuum tubes as the patent for this device is now in the public domain. These tubes are manufactured with a specific volume of gas removed from the sealed tube. When a needle from a hub or transfer device is inserted into the stopper, the tube's vacuum automatically pulls in the required volume of blood.

The basic Evacuated Tube System (ETS) consists of a needle, a tube holder, and the evacuated tubes. The needle is attached to the tube holder by the phlebotomist prior to collection, or may come from the manufacturer as one unit. The needle protrudes through the end of the tube holder, and has a needle on each end. After first cleaning the venipuncture site and applying a tourniquet, the phlebotomist uncaps the needle attached to the tube holder, inserts the needle into the vein, then slides evacuated tubes into the tube holder, where the tube's stopper is pierced by the back end of the needle. The vacuum in the tube then automatically draws the needed blood directly from the vein. Multiple vacuum tubes can be attached to and removed in turn from a single needle, allowing multiple samples to be obtained from a single procedure. This is possible due to the multiple sample sleeve, which is a flexible rubber fitting over the posterior end of the needle cannula which seals the needle until it is pushed out of the way. This keeps blood from freely draining out of the back of the needle inserted in the vein, as each test tube is removed and the next impaled. OSHA safety regulations require that needles or tube holders come equipped with a safety device to cover the needle after the procedure to prevent accidental needle stick injury.

Fittings and adapters used to fill evacuated tubes from butterfly needle kits and syringes are also available.

There are several needle gauges for a phlebotomist to choose from. The most commonly used are as follows: a 21g (green top) needle, a 22g (black top) needle, a 21g (green label) butterfly needle, a 23g (light blue label) butterfly needle, and a 25g (orange or dark blue label) butterfly needle (however this needle is only used in pediatrics or extreme cases as it is so small that it can often result in hemolyzing the blood sample). There are also a variety of tube and bottle sizes and volumes for different test requirements.

=== Additives and order of draw ===
The test tubes in which blood is collected may contain one or more of several additives. In general, tests requiring whole blood call for blood samples collected in test tubes containing some form of the anticoagulant EDTA. EDTA chelates calcium to prevent clotting. EDTA is preferred for hematology tests because it does minimum damage to cell morphology. Sodium citrate is the anticoagulant used in specimens collected for coagulation tests. The majority of chemistry and immunology tests are performed on serum, which is produced by clotting and then separating the blood specimen via centrifuge. These specimens are collected in either a non-additive tube or one containing a clotting activator. This clotting activator can interfere with some assays, and so a plain tube is recommended in these cases, but will delay testing. Tubes containing lithium heparin or sodium heparin are also commonly used for a variety of chemistry tests, as they do not require clotting and can be centrifuged immediately after collection. A combination of sodium fluoride and potassium oxalate is used for glucose tests, as these additives both prevent clotting and stop glycolysis, so that blood glucose levels are preserved after collection. Another specialty tube is an opaque amber colored tube used to collect blood for light sensitive analytes, such as bilirubin.

Test tubes are labeled with the additive they contain, but the stopper on each tube is color coded according to additive as well. While colors vary between manufacturers, stopper colors generally are associated with each additive as listed below. Because the additives from each tube can be left on the needle used to fill the tubes, they must be drawn in a specific order to ensure that cross contamination will not negatively affect testing of the samples if multiple tubes are to be drawn at once. The "order of draw" varies by collection method. Order of draw refers to the proper order to fill tubes with blood to prevent additive contamination for certain test. Below is the order of draw generally required for the Evacuated Tube System (ETS) collection method and the most common tubes, listing additive and color:

In some cases a capillary draw (also known as a dermal puncture) is substituted for venipuncture, a situation occasionally encountered with pediatric patients, situations where the patient may have severe burns or skin damage, or when vein access has become difficult. In instance of a capillary draw, the order of draw changes. For capillary collection, blood gas testing is recommended first, followed by tubes with EDTA additive, to prevent blood from clotting during collection. Therefore, the common order of draw does not apply when choosing to substitute a capillary collection for venipuncture.

Vacutainer/sample tube types for venipuncture/phlebotomy
Tube cap color or type in order of draw	Additive	Usage and comments
Blood culture bottle	Sodium polyanethol sulfonate (anticoagulant) and growth media for microorganisms	Usually drawn first for minimal risk of contamination. Two bottles are typically collected in one blood draw; one for aerobic organisms and one for anaerobic organisms.
Blue ("light blue")	Sodium citrate (weak calcium chelator/anticoagulant)	Coagulation tests such as prothrombin time (PT) and partial thromboplastin time (PTT) and thrombin time (TT). Tube must be filled to the proper line.
Plain red	No additive	Serum: Total complement activity, cryoglobulins
Gold (sometimes red and grey "tiger top")	Clot activator and serum separating gel	Serum-separating tube (SST): Tube inversions promote clotting. Most chemistry, endocrine and serology tests, including hepatitis and HIV.
Orange	Clot activator and serum separating gel	Rapid serum-separating tube (RST).
Dark green	Sodium heparin (anticoagulant)	Chromosome testing, HLA typing, ammonia, lactate
Light green	Lithium heparin (anticoagulant) Plasma separator gel	Plasma. Tube inversions prevent clotting
Lavender ("purple")	EDTA (chelator / anticoagulant)	Whole blood: CBC, ESR, Coombs test, platelet antibodies, flow cytometry, blood levels of tacrolimus and cyclosporin
Pink	K_{2} EDTA (chelator / anticoagulant)	Blood typing and cross-matching, direct Coombs test, HIV viral load
Royal blue ("navy")	EDTA (chelator / anticoagulant)	Trace elements, heavy metals, most drug levels, toxicology
Tan	Sodium EDTA (chelator / anticoagulant)	Lead
Gray	Fluoride Oxalate: Sodium fluoride (glycolysis inhibitor); Potassium oxalate (anticoagulant)	Glucose, lactate, toxicology
Yellow	Acid-citrate-dextrose A (anticoagulant)	Tissue typing, DNA studies, HIV cultures
Pearlescent ("white")	Separating gel and (K_{2})EDTA	PCR for adenovirus, toxoplasma and HHV-6
Black	Sodium Citrate	Paediatric ESR
QuantiFERON Grey, Green, Yellow, Purple	QuantiFERON: 1. Grey (nil) tube 2. Green (TB1 antigen) tube 3. Yellow (TB2 antigen) tube 4. Purple (mitogen) tube	Tuberculosis

== In children ==
Several pain managements methods are available to use when performing venipuncture on a child. Effective methods can include the use of lidocaine, a vapo-cooling spray, or distraction techniques. Lidocaine methods are suggested to be the most effective at reducing pain during venipuncture. Multiple methods of lidocaine delivery are possible. An EMLA formula consisting of a mixture of lidocaine and prilocaine can be used, and is available in the form of a cream or a patch, typically applied up to an hour before the procedure. Lidocaine iontophoresis is a potentially more effective technique. This approach uses an electrode system to transport ionized lidocaine across the skin, and can provide effective pain management within minutes. Another method involves needle-free lidocaine "injection", and uses pressure from compressed gas to deliver the lidocaine past the skin barrier.

For children under 12 months of age, an orally administered dose of sucrose solution can be used as a mild pain-relieving intervention during venipuncture and other procedures. For clinical use, a low dose of oral sucrose is recommended two minutes in advance of the procedure to reduce infant discomfort. Advantages of this intervention include minimal negative side effects, ease of availability, and ease of administration.

Non-pharmacological treatments for venipuncture-associated pain in children includes hypnosis and distraction techniques, including breathing exercises. These treatments reduced self-reported pain when combined with cognitive-behavioural therapy (CBT).

== With needle and syringe ==
Some health care workers prefer to use a syringe-needle technique for venipuncture. Sarstedt manufactures a blood-drawing system (S-Monovette) that uses this principle. This method can be preferred on the elderly, those with cancer, severe burns, obesity, or where the veins are unreliable or fragile. Because syringes are manually operated, the amount of suction applied may be easily controlled. This is particularly helpful when veins are small which may collapse under the suction of an evacuated tube. In children or other circumstances where the quantity of blood gained may be limited it can be helpful to know how much blood can be obtained before distributing it amongst the various additives that the laboratory will require. Another alternative is drawing blood from indwelling cannulae.

== Blood cultures ==
There are times when a blood culture collection is required. Normal blood is sterile, but if pathogen presence is suspected, a culture is helpful to look for infection. When drawing blood from cultures, use a sterile solution such as Betadine rather than alcohol. This is done using sterile gloves, while not wiping away the surgical solution, touching the puncture site, or in any way compromising the sterile process. It is vital that the procedure is performed in as sterile a manner as possible as the persistent presence of common skin-dwelling bacteria in blood cultures could indicate endocarditis but they are most often found as contaminants. It is encouraged to use an abrasive method of skin preparation. This removes the upper layers of dead skin cells along with their contaminating bacteria. Povidone-iodine has traditionally been used but in the UK a 2% chlorhexidine in 70% ethanol or isopropyl alcohol solution is preferred and time must be allowed for it to dry. The tops of any containers used when drawing a blood culture should also be disinfected using a similar solution. Some labs will actively discourage iodine use where iodine is thought to degrade the rubber stopper through which blood enters the bottle, thus allowing contaminates to enter the container. However, some studies have found this concern to be unsupported due to no significant difference being found between contamination rates with these different disinfectant agents.

The blood is collected into special transport bottles, which are like vacuum tubes but shaped differently. The blood culture bottle contains transport media to preserve any microorganisms present while they are being transported to the laboratory for cultures. Because it is unknown whether the pathogens are anaerobic (living without oxygen) or aerobic (living with oxygen), blood is collected to test for both. The aerobic bottle is filled first, and then the anaerobic bottle is filled. However, if the collection is performed using a syringe, the anaerobic bottle is filled first. If a butterfly collection kit is used, the aerobic bottle is filled first, so that any air in the tubing is released into the oxygen-containing bottle.

Specially designed blood culture collection bottles eliminate the need for either the syringe or butterfly collection method. These specially designed bottles have long necks that fit into the evacuated tubes holders that are use for regular venipuncture collection. These bottles also allow for collection of other blood specimens via evacuated tubes, to be collected without additional venipuncture.

The volume of blood that is collected is critical for the optimal collection of microorganisms. Up to 10mL of blood is typical, but can vary according to the recommendations of the manufacturer of the collection bottle. When collecting both aerobic and anaerobic bottles, a total volume of 20-30 mL will be needed per set to provide 10 mL for each of the two bottles. Pediatric collection is typically satisfied with 1-5 mL, but varies with child weight.If too little blood is collected, the ratio of blood-to-nutrient broth will inhibit the growth of microorganisms. If too much blood is collected, the blood-to-nutrient broth ratio will also be nonconductive to microorganism growth, and a risk of hospital-induced anemia is also present.

The bottles are then incubated in specialized units for 24 hours before a lab technician studies and/or tests it. This step allows the very small numbers of bacteria (potentially 1 or 2 organisms) to multiply to a level which is sufficient for identification +/-antibiotic resistance testing. Modern blood culture bottles have an indicator in the base which changes color in the presence of bacterial growth and can be read automatically by machine. (For this reason the barcoded stickers found on these bottles should not be removed as they are used by the laboratory's automated systems.)

== Taking blood samples from animals ==
Blood samples from living laboratory animals may be collected using following methods:

- Blood collection not requiring anesthesia:
  - Saphenous vein (rat, mice, guinea pig)
  - Dorsal pedal vein (rat, mice)
- Blood collection requiring anesthesia (local/general anesthesia):
  - Tail vein (rat, mice)
  - Tail snip (mice)
  - Orbital sinus (rat, mice)
  - Jugular vein (rat, mice)
  - Temporary cannula (rat, mice)
  - Blood vessel cannulation (guinea pig, ferret)
  - Tarsal vein (guinea pig)
  - Marginal ear vein or artery (rabbit)
- Terminal procedure:
  - Cardiac puncture (rat, mice, guinea pig, rabbit, ferret)
  - Orbital sinus (rat, mice)
  - Posterior vena cava (rat, mice)

The volume of the blood sample collection is very important in experimental animals. All nonterminal blood collection without replacement of fluids is limited up to 10% of total circulating blood volume in healthy, normal, adult animals on a single occasion and collection may be repeated after three to four weeks. In case repeated blood samples are required at short intervals, a maximum of 0.6 ml/kg/day or 1.0% of an animal's total blood volume can be removed every 24 hours. The estimated blood volume in adult animals is 55 to 70 ml/kg body weight. Care should be taken for older and obese animals. If blood collection volume exceeds more than 10% of total blood volume, fluid replacement may be required. Lactated Ringer's solution (LRS) is recommended as the best fluid replacement by National Institutes of Health (NIH). If the volume of blood collection exceeds more than 30% of the total circulatory blood volume, adequate care should be taken so that the animal does not develop hypovolemia.

== See also ==
- Arterial blood is taken from an artery instead of a vein
- Blood test – Laboratory analysis performed on a blood sample
