= Test tube =

Glass or plastic laboratory glassware

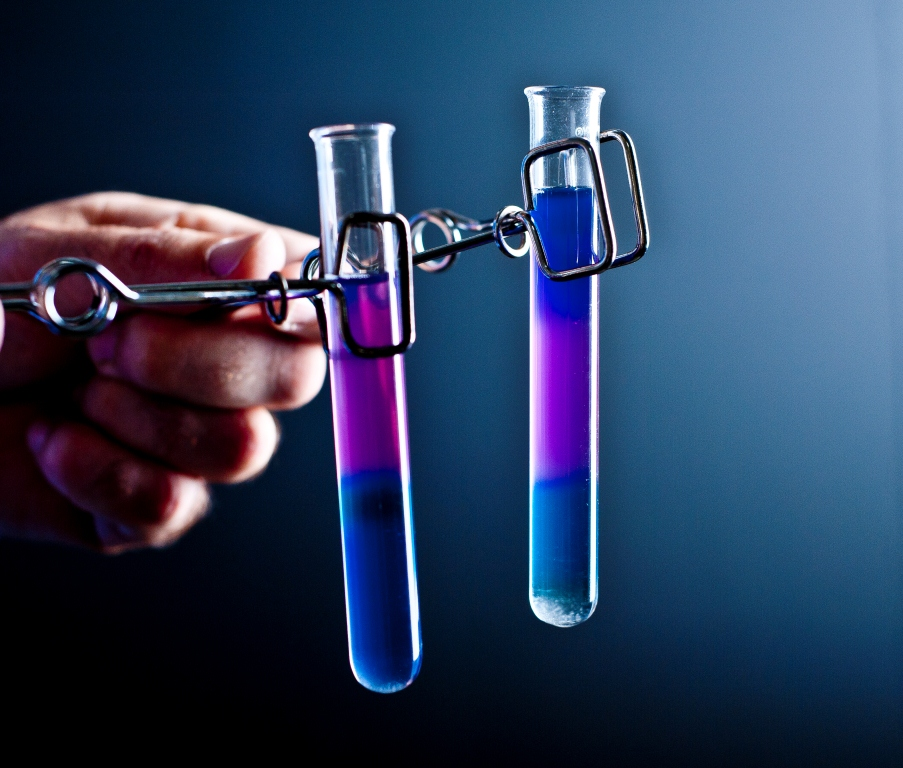
- Two small test tubes held in spring clamps
- Other names: Culture tube
- Uses: Chemical reaction
- Related items: Vacutainer; Boiling tube Centrifuge tube

A test tube, also known as a culture tube or sample tube, is a common piece of laboratory glassware consisting of a finger-like length or longer of glass or clear plastic tubing, open at the top and closed at the bottom.

Test tubes are usually placed in special-purpose racks.

== Types and usage ==
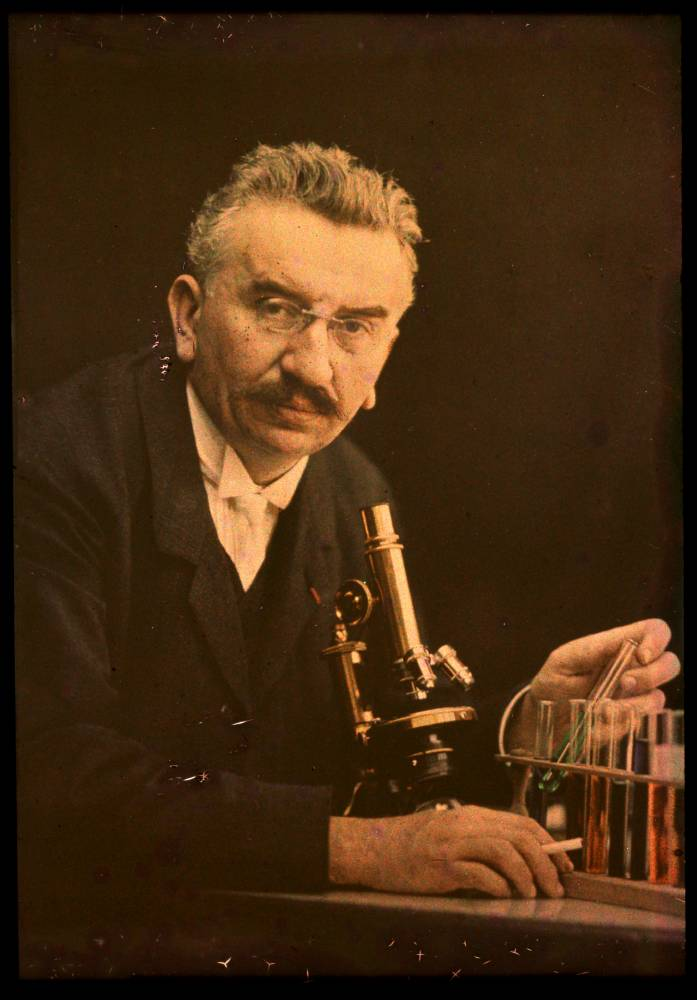
Louis Lumière with a microscope and some test tubes

=== Chemistry ===
Test tubes intended for general chemical work are usually made of glass, for its relative resistance to heat. Tubes made from expansion-resistant glasses, mostly borosilicate glass or fused quartz, can withstand high temperatures up to several hundred degrees Celsius.

Chemistry tubes are available in a multitude of lengths and widths, typically from 10 to 20 mm wide and 50 to 200 mm long. The top often features a flared lip to aid pouring out the contents.

A chemistry test tube typically has a flat bottom, a round bottom, or a conical bottom. Some test tubes are made to accept a ground glass stopper or a screw cap. They are often provided with a small ground glass or white glaze area near the top for labelling with a pencil.

Test tubes are widely used by chemists to handle chemicals, especially for qualitative experiments and assays. Their spherical bottom and vertical sides reduce mass loss when pouring, make them easier to wash out, and allow convenient monitoring of the contents. The long, narrow neck of test tube slows down the spreading of gases to the environment.

Test tubes are convenient containers for heating small amounts of liquids or solids with a Bunsen burner or alcohol burner. The tube is usually held by its neck with a clamp or tongs. By tilting the tube, the bottom can be heated to hundreds of degrees in the flame, while the neck remains relatively cool, possibly allowing vapours to condense on its walls. A boiling tube is a large test tube intended specifically for boiling liquids.

A test tube filled with water and upturned into a water-filled beaker is often used to capture gases, e.g. in electrolysis demonstrations.

A test tube with a stopper is often used for temporary storage of chemical or biological samples.

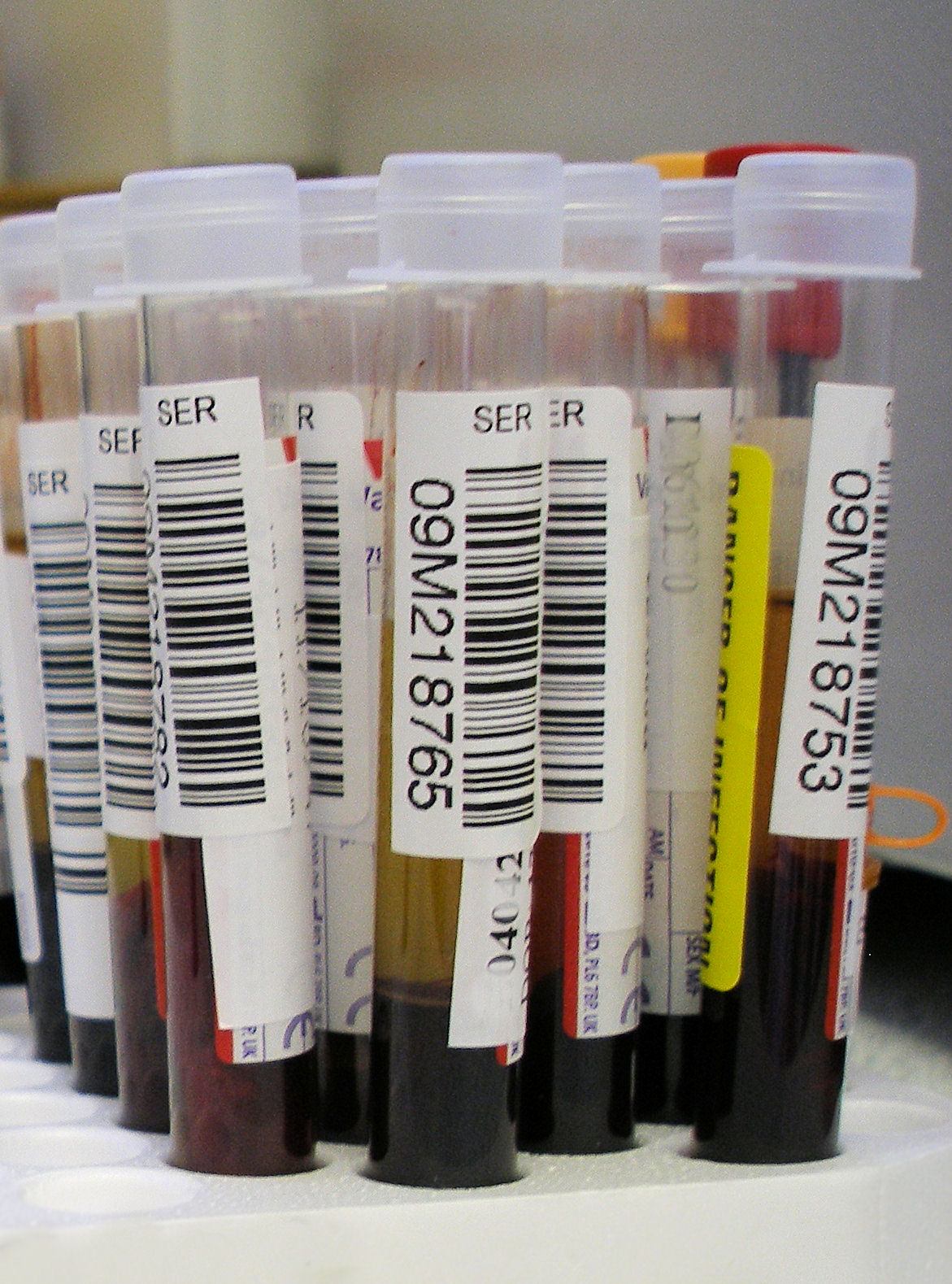
Samples of human blood collected for blood tests

=== Biosciences ===
Culture tubes are test tubes used in biology and related sciences for handling and culturing all kinds of live organisms, such as molds, bacteria, seedlings, plant cuttings, etc.. Some racks for culture tubes are designed to hold the tubes in a nearly horizontal position, so as to maximize the surface of the culture medium inside.

Culture tubes for biology are usually made of clear plastic (such as polystyrene or polypropylene) by injection molding and are often discarded after use. Plastic test tubes with a screwtop cap are often called "Falcon tubes" after a line manufactured by Becton Dickinson.

Some sources consider that the presence of a lip is what distinguishes a test tube from a culture tube.

=== Clinical medicine ===
In clinical medicine, sterile test tubes with air removed, called vacutainers, are used to collect and hold samples of physiological fluids such as blood, urine, pus, and synovial fluid. These tubes are commonly sealed with a rubber stopper and often have a specific additive placed in the tube with the stopper color indicating the additive. For example, a blue-top tube is a 5 ml test tube containing sodium citrate as an anticoagulant, used to collect blood for coagulation and glucose-6-phosphate dehydrogenase testing. Small vials used in medicine may have a snap-top (also called a hinge cap) molded as part of the vial.

Vacutainer/sample tube types for venipuncture/phlebotomy
Tube cap color or type in order of draw	Additive	Usage and comments
Blood culture bottle	Sodium polyanethol sulfonate (anticoagulant) and growth media for microorganisms	Usually drawn first for minimal risk of contamination. Two bottles are typically collected in one blood draw; one for aerobic organisms and one for anaerobic organisms.
Blue ("light blue")	Sodium citrate (weak calcium chelator/anticoagulant)	Coagulation tests such as prothrombin time (PT) and partial thromboplastin time (PTT) and thrombin time (TT). Tube must be filled to the proper line.
Plain red	No additive	Serum: Total complement activity, cryoglobulins
Gold (sometimes red and grey "tiger top")	Clot activator and serum separating gel	Serum-separating tube (SST): Tube inversions promote clotting. Most chemistry, endocrine and serology tests, including hepatitis and HIV.
Orange	Clot activator and serum separating gel	Rapid serum-separating tube (RST).
Dark green	Sodium heparin (anticoagulant)	Chromosome testing, HLA typing, ammonia, lactate
Light green	Lithium heparin (anticoagulant) Plasma separator gel	Plasma. Tube inversions prevent clotting
Lavender ("purple")	EDTA (chelator / anticoagulant)	Whole blood: CBC, ESR, Coombs test, platelet antibodies, flow cytometry, blood levels of tacrolimus and cyclosporin
Pink	K_{2} EDTA (chelator / anticoagulant)	Blood typing and cross-matching, direct Coombs test, HIV viral load
Royal blue ("navy")	EDTA (chelator / anticoagulant)	Trace elements, heavy metals, most drug levels, toxicology
Tan	Sodium EDTA (chelator / anticoagulant)	Lead
Gray	Fluoride Oxalate: Sodium fluoride (glycolysis inhibitor); Potassium oxalate (anticoagulant)	Glucose, lactate, toxicology
Yellow	Acid-citrate-dextrose A (anticoagulant)	Tissue typing, DNA studies, HIV cultures
Pearlescent ("white")	Separating gel and (K_{2})EDTA	PCR for adenovirus, toxoplasma and HHV-6
Black	Sodium Citrate	Paediatric ESR
QuantiFERON Grey, Green, Yellow, Purple	QuantiFERON: 1. Grey (nil) tube 2. Green (TB1 antigen) tube 3. Yellow (TB2 antigen) tube 4. Purple (mitogen) tube	Tuberculosis

=== Other uses ===
Test tubes are sometimes put to casual uses outside of lab environments, e.g. as flower vases, glassware for certain weak shots, or containers for spices. They can also be used for raising queen ants during their first months of development.

== Variants ==
=== Boiling tube ===
A boiling tube is a small cylindrical vessel used to strongly heat substances in the flame of a Bunsen burner. It is essentially a scaled-up test tube, being about 50% larger.

They are designed to be wide enough to allow substances to boil violently, as opposed to a test tube, which is too narrow; a boiling liquid can explode out of the end of test tubes when they are heated, as there is no room for bubbles of gas to escape independently of the surrounding liquid. This phenomenon is called bumping.

=== Ignition tube ===
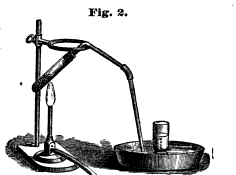
An illustration of a setup using an ignition tube. The ignition tube is being heated by the Bunsen burner on the left, with the heated gas escaping from the tube to the pan via the delivery tube on top and at right.

An ignition tube is used in much the same way as a boiling tube, except it is not as large and thick-walled. It is primarily used to hold small quantities of substances which are undergoing direct heating by a Bunsen burner or other heat source. This type of tube is used in the sodium fusion test.

Ignition tubes are often difficult to clean due to the small bore. When used to heat substances strongly, some char may stick to the walls as well. They are usually disposable.

== See also ==
- Test tube holder
- Test tube brush
- Microtiter plate

Eight-cavity culture-tube mold (Lake Charles Manufacturing)
