= Vial =

Small glass vessel or bottle used in laboratories or hospitals

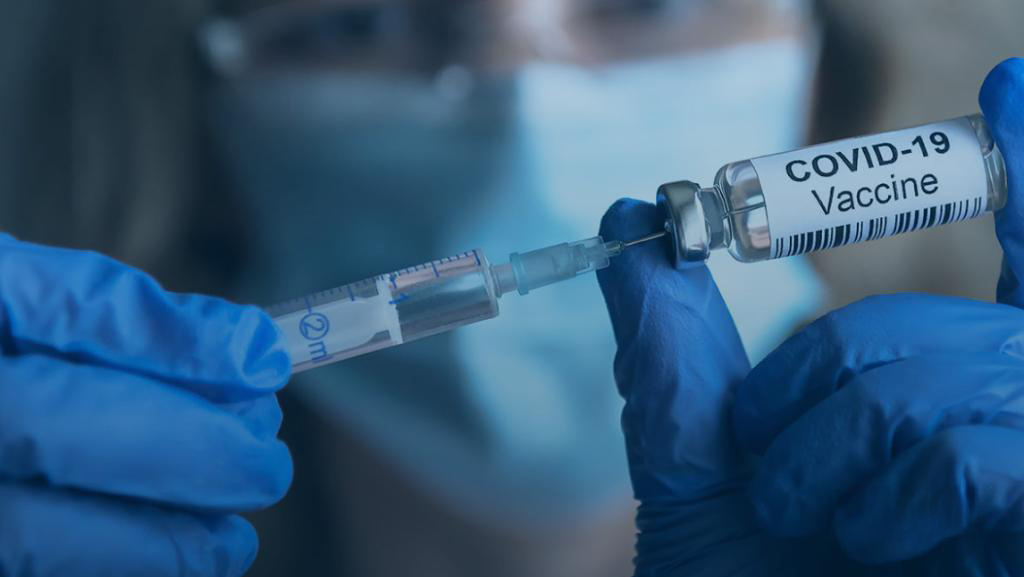
A vial containing a dose of a COVID-19 vaccine, with a syringe being inserted to draw up the contents of the vial

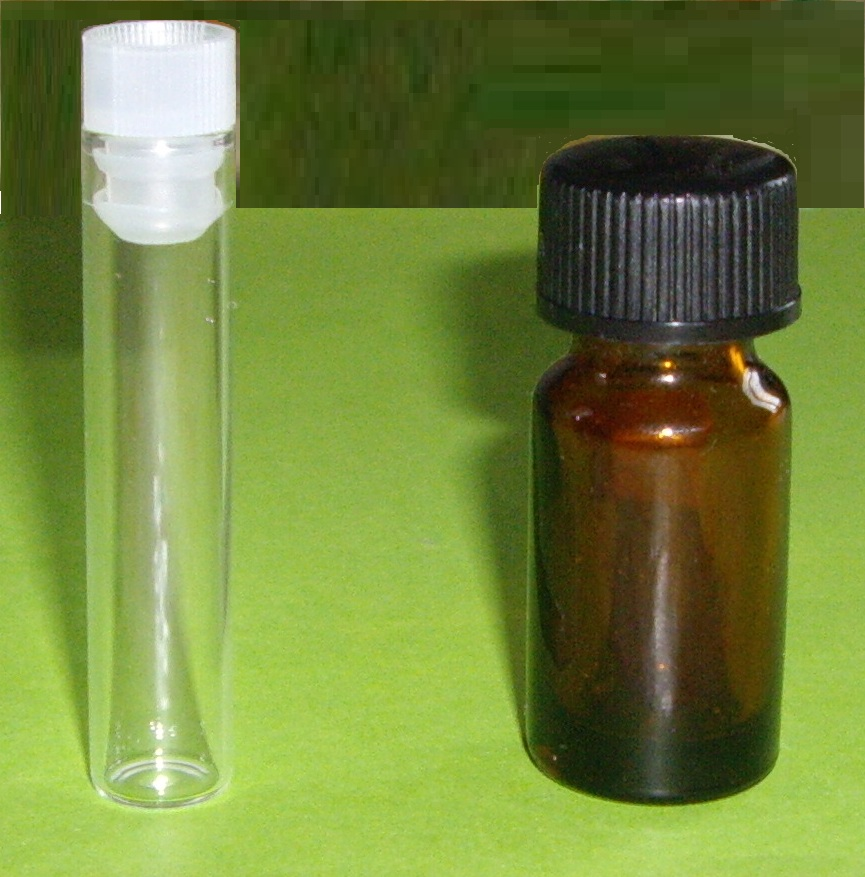
Examples of modern flat-bottomed plastic vials

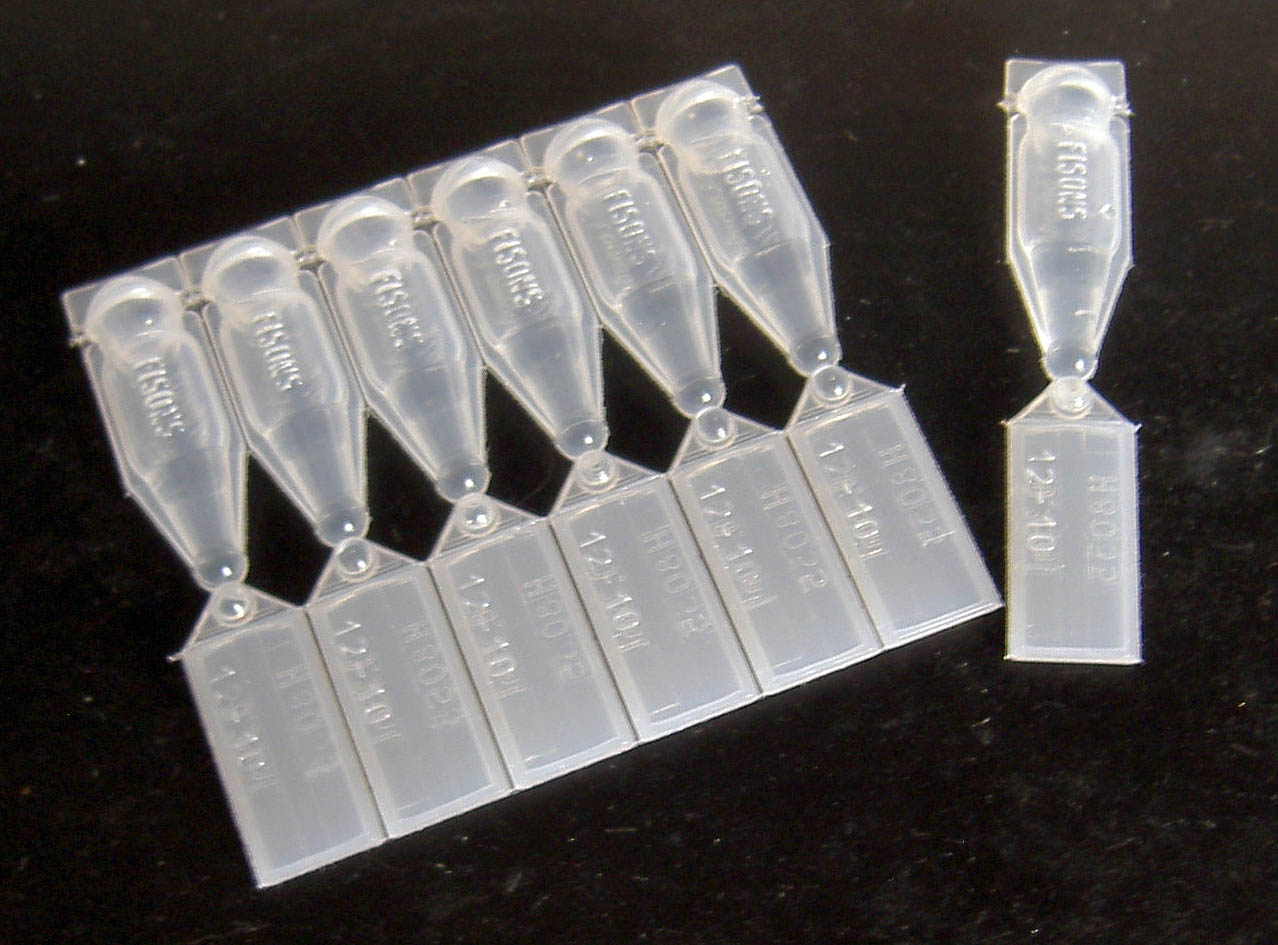
Sterile single-use vial of eye drops

A vial (also known as a phial or flacon) is a small glass or plastic vessel or bottle, often used to store medication in the form of liquids, powders, or capsules. They can also be used as scientific sample vessels; for instance, in autosampler devices in analytical chromatography. Vial-like glass containers date back to classical antiquity; modern vials are often made of plastics such as polypropylene. There are different types of vials such as a single dose vial and multi-dose vials often used for medications. The single dose vial is only used once whereas a multi-dose vial can be used more than once. The CDC sets specific guidelines on multi-dose vials.

== History and etymology ==
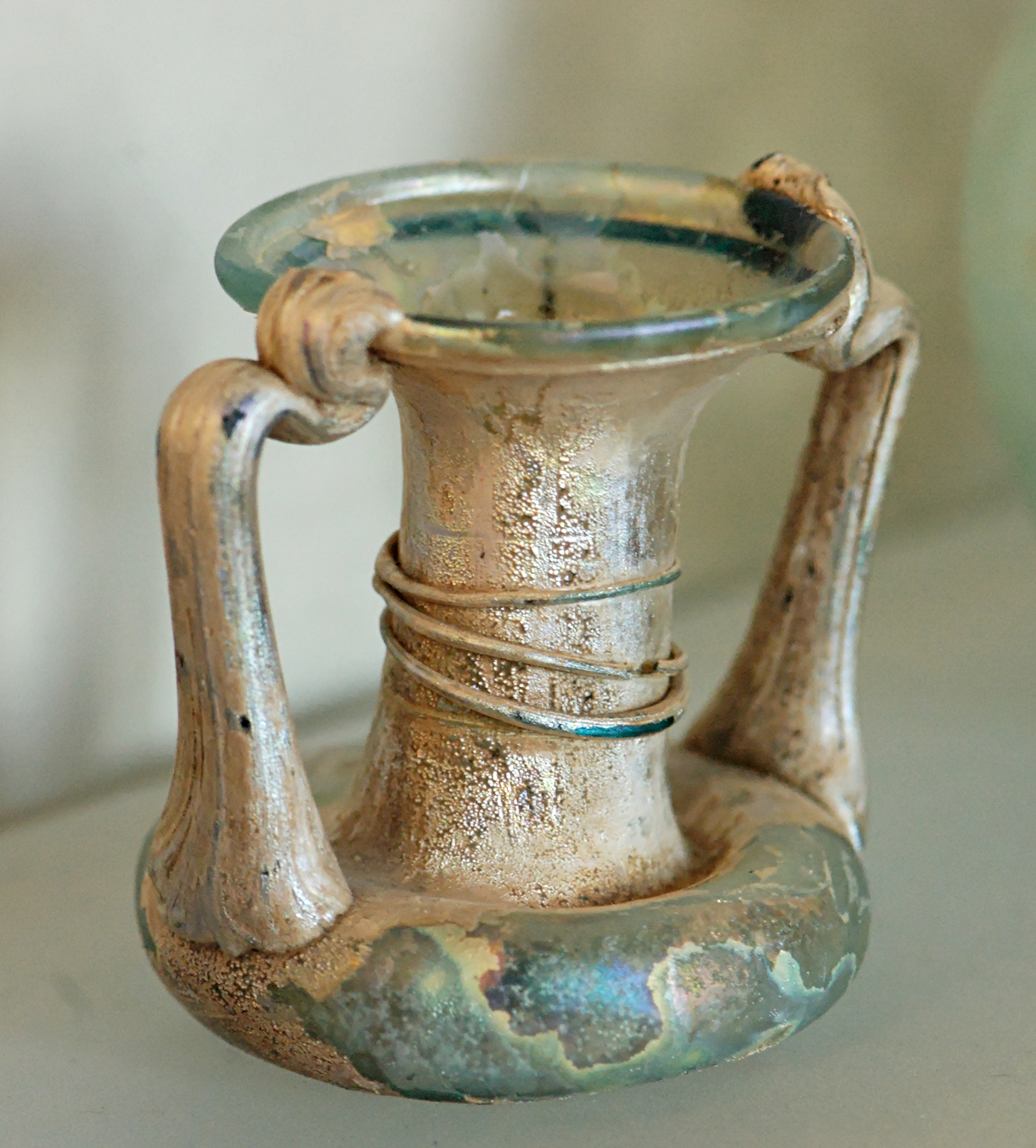
A double-handled glass vial from Syria, c. 4th century AD

A vial can be tubular, or have a bottle-like shape with a neck. The volume defined by the neck is known as the headspace. The English word "vial" is derived from the Greek phiale, meaning "a broad flat container". Comparable terms include the Latin phiala, Late Latin fiola and Middle English fiole and viole.

== Modern vials ==
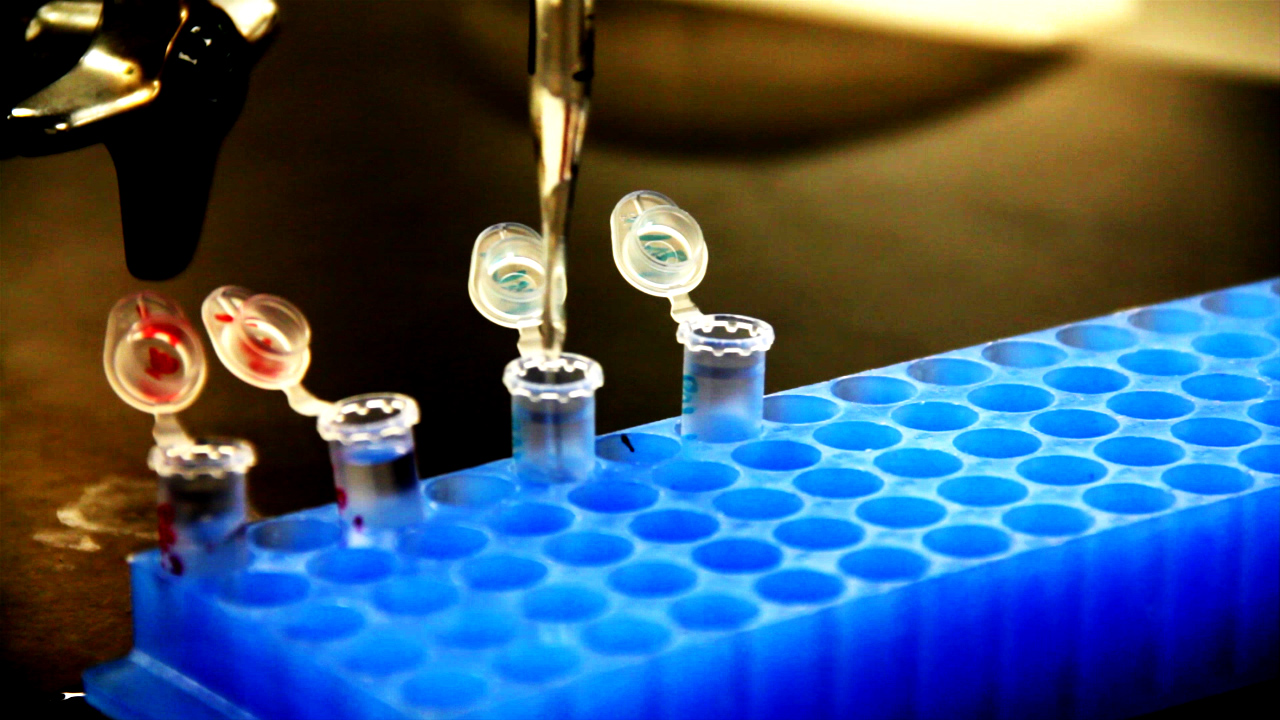
Plastic hinge-top vials on a vial rack

Modern vials are often made out of glass or plastic. They are often used as storage for small quantities of liquid used in medical or molecular biology applications. There are several different types of commonly used closure systems. For glass vials, options include screw vials (closed with a screw cap or dropper/pipette), lip vials (closed with a cork or plastic stopper) and crimp vials (closed with a rubber stopper and a metal cap). Plastic vials, which can be moulded in plastic, can have other closure systems, such as 'hinge caps' which snap shut when pressed. These are sometimes called flip-tops or snap caps.

The bottom of a vial is often flat, unlike test tubes, which have usually a rounded bottom, but this is often not the case for small hinge-cap or snap-top vials. The small bottle-shaped vials typically used in laboratories are also known as bijou or McCartney's bottles. The bijou bottle tends to be smaller, often with a volume of around 10 milliliters.

== See also ==
- Ampoule
- Seven bowls, also referred to as "seven vials", a series of plagues mentioned in the Biblical Book of Revelation
- Vacutainer

== Bibliography ==
- Hans-Jürgen Bässler and Frank Lehmann (2013). Containment Technology: Progress in the Pharmaceutical and Food Processing Industry. Springer (Berlin). ISBN 978-3642392917.
