= Vacutainer =

Type of blood collection equipment for medical testing

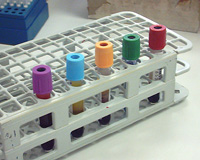
A range of Vacutainer tubes containing blood

A vacutainer blood collection tube is a sterile glass or plastic test tube with a colored rubber stopper creating a vacuum seal inside of the tube, facilitating the drawing of a predetermined volume of liquid. Vacutainer tubes may contain additives designed to stabilize and preserve the specimen prior to analytical testing. Tubes are available with a safety-engineered stopper, with a variety of labeling options and draw volumes. The color of the top indicates the additives in the vial.

Vacutainer tubes were invented by Joseph Kleiner in 1949. Vacutainer is a registered trademark of Becton Dickinson, which manufactures and sells the tubes today.

== Principles ==
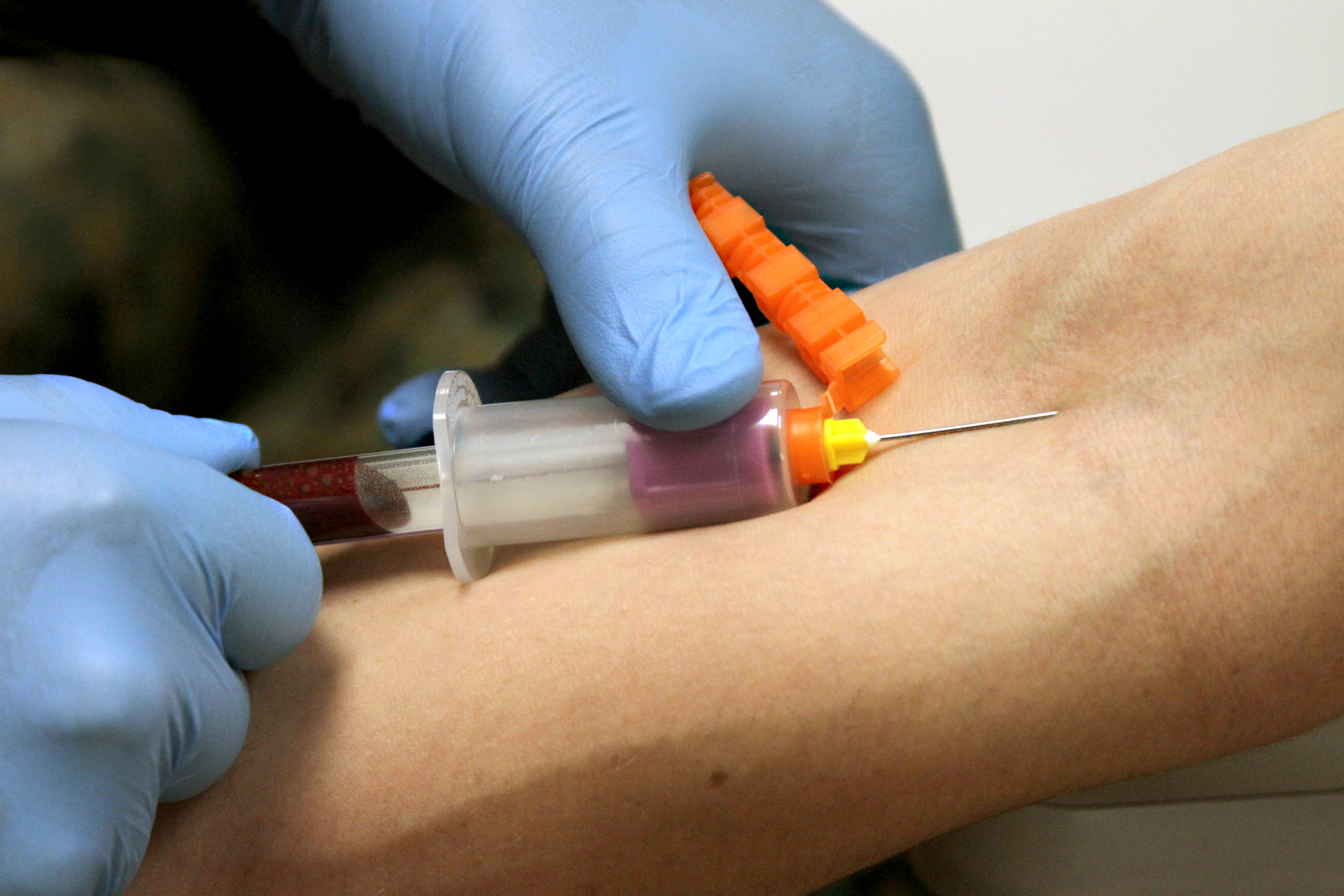
Drawing blood from the median cubital vein using a vacutainer. The clear plastic sheath around the top of the tube holds the needle. The orange guard will shield the needle after it is withdrawn from the patient to protect from accidental needle stick injury.

The Vacutainer needle is double-ended: the inner end is encased in a thin rubber coating that prevents blood from leaking out if the Vacutainer tubes are changed during a multi-draw, and the outer end which is inserted into the vein. When the needle is screwed into the translucent plastic needle holder, the coated end is inside the holder.

When a tube is inserted into the holder, its rubber cap is punctured by this inner needle and the vacuum in the tube pulls blood through the needle and into the tube. The filled tube is then removed and another can be inserted and filled the same way. The amount of air evacuated from the tube predetermines how much blood will fill the tube before blood stops flowing.

Each tube is topped with a color-coded plastic or rubber cap. Tubes often include additives that mix with the blood when collected, and the color of each tube's plastic cap indicates which additives it contains.

Blood collection tubes expire because over time the vacuum is lost and blood will not be drawn into the tube when the needle punctures the cap.

== Types of tubes ==
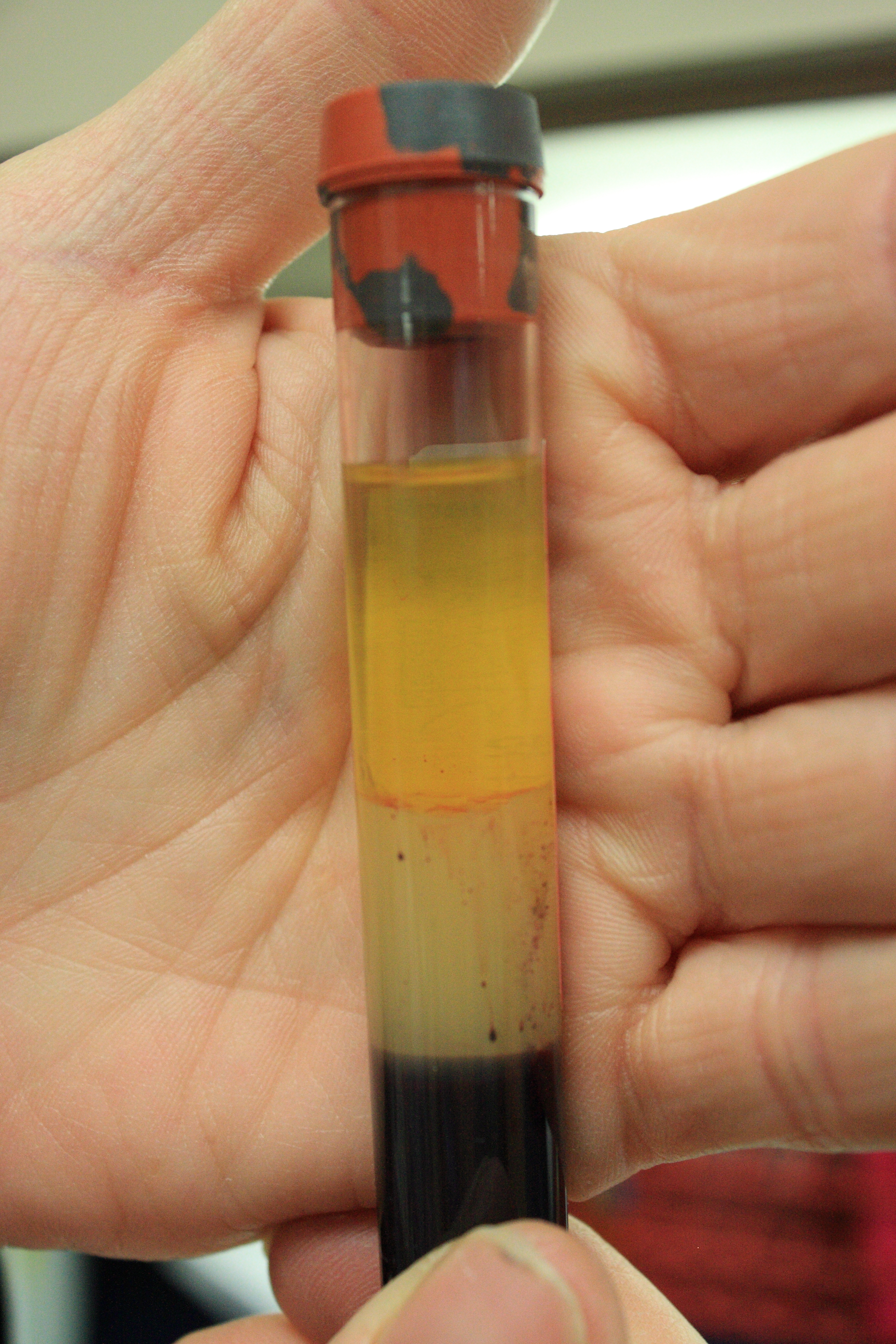
A tiger top tube after centrifugation to separate blood cells from serum

Vacutainer tubes may contain additional substances that preserve blood for processing in a medical laboratory. Using the wrong tube may make the blood sample unusable for the intended purpose. These additives are typically thin film coatings applied using an ultrasonic nozzle.

The additives may include anticoagulants (EDTA, sodium citrate, heparin) or a gel with density between those of blood cells and blood plasma. Additionally, some tubes contain additives that preserve certain components of or substances within the blood, such as glucose. When a tube is centrifuged, the materials within are separated by density, with the blood cells sinking to the bottom and the plasma or serum accumulating at the top. Tubes containing gel can be easily handled and transported after centrifugation without the blood cells and serum mixing.

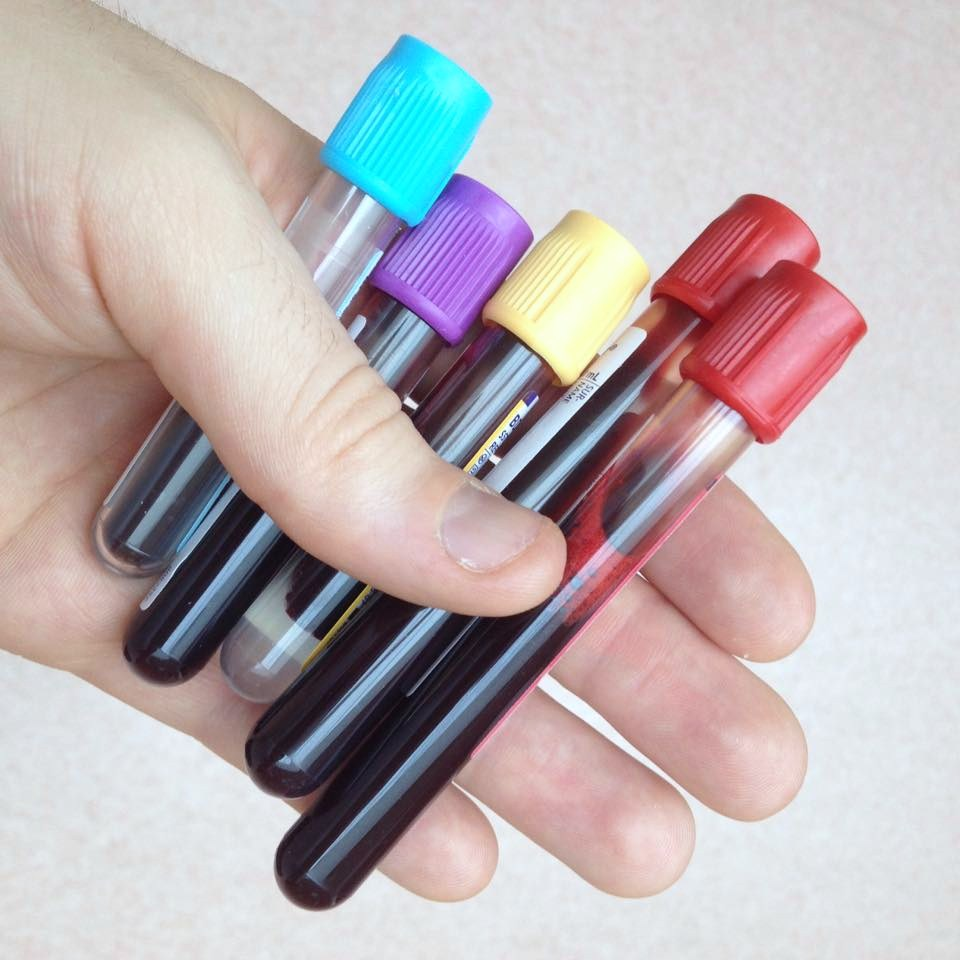
Vacutainer blood tubes

The meanings of the various colors are standardized by the Clinical and Laboratory Standards Institute and are the same across manufacturers.

The term order of draw refers to the sequence in which tubes should be filled. The needle which pierces the tubes can carry additives from one tube into the next, so the sequence is standardized so that any cross-contamination of additives will not affect laboratory results.

Vacutainer/sample tube types for venipuncture/phlebotomy
Tube cap color or type in order of draw	Additive	Usage and comments
Blood culture bottle	Sodium polyanethol sulfonate (anticoagulant) and growth media for microorganisms	Usually drawn first for minimal risk of contamination. Two bottles are typically collected in one blood draw; one for aerobic organisms and one for anaerobic organisms.
Blue ("light blue")	Sodium citrate (weak calcium chelator/anticoagulant)	Coagulation tests such as prothrombin time (PT) and partial thromboplastin time (PTT) and thrombin time (TT). Tube must be filled to the proper line.
Plain red	No additive	Serum: Total complement activity, cryoglobulins
Gold (sometimes red and grey "tiger top")	Clot activator and serum separating gel	Serum-separating tube (SST): Tube inversions promote clotting. Most chemistry, endocrine and serology tests, including hepatitis and HIV.
Orange	Clot activator and serum separating gel	Rapid serum-separating tube (RST).
Dark green	Sodium heparin (anticoagulant)	Chromosome testing, HLA typing, ammonia, lactate
Light green	Lithium heparin (anticoagulant) Plasma separator gel	Plasma. Tube inversions prevent clotting
Lavender ("purple")	EDTA (chelator / anticoagulant)	Whole blood: CBC, ESR, Coombs test, platelet antibodies, flow cytometry, blood levels of tacrolimus and cyclosporin
Pink	K_{2} EDTA (chelator / anticoagulant)	Blood typing and cross-matching, direct Coombs test, HIV viral load
Royal blue ("navy")	EDTA (chelator / anticoagulant)	Trace elements, heavy metals, most drug levels, toxicology
Tan	Sodium EDTA (chelator / anticoagulant)	Lead
Gray	Fluoride Oxalate: Sodium fluoride (glycolysis inhibitor); Potassium oxalate (anticoagulant)	Glucose, lactate, toxicology
Yellow	Acid-citrate-dextrose A (anticoagulant)	Tissue typing, DNA studies, HIV cultures
Pearlescent ("white")	Separating gel and (K_{2})EDTA	PCR for adenovirus, toxoplasma and HHV-6
Black	Sodium Citrate	Paediatric ESR
QuantiFERON Grey, Green, Yellow, Purple	QuantiFERON: 1. Grey (nil) tube 2. Green (TB1 antigen) tube 3. Yellow (TB2 antigen) tube 4. Purple (mitogen) tube	Tuberculosis

== History ==
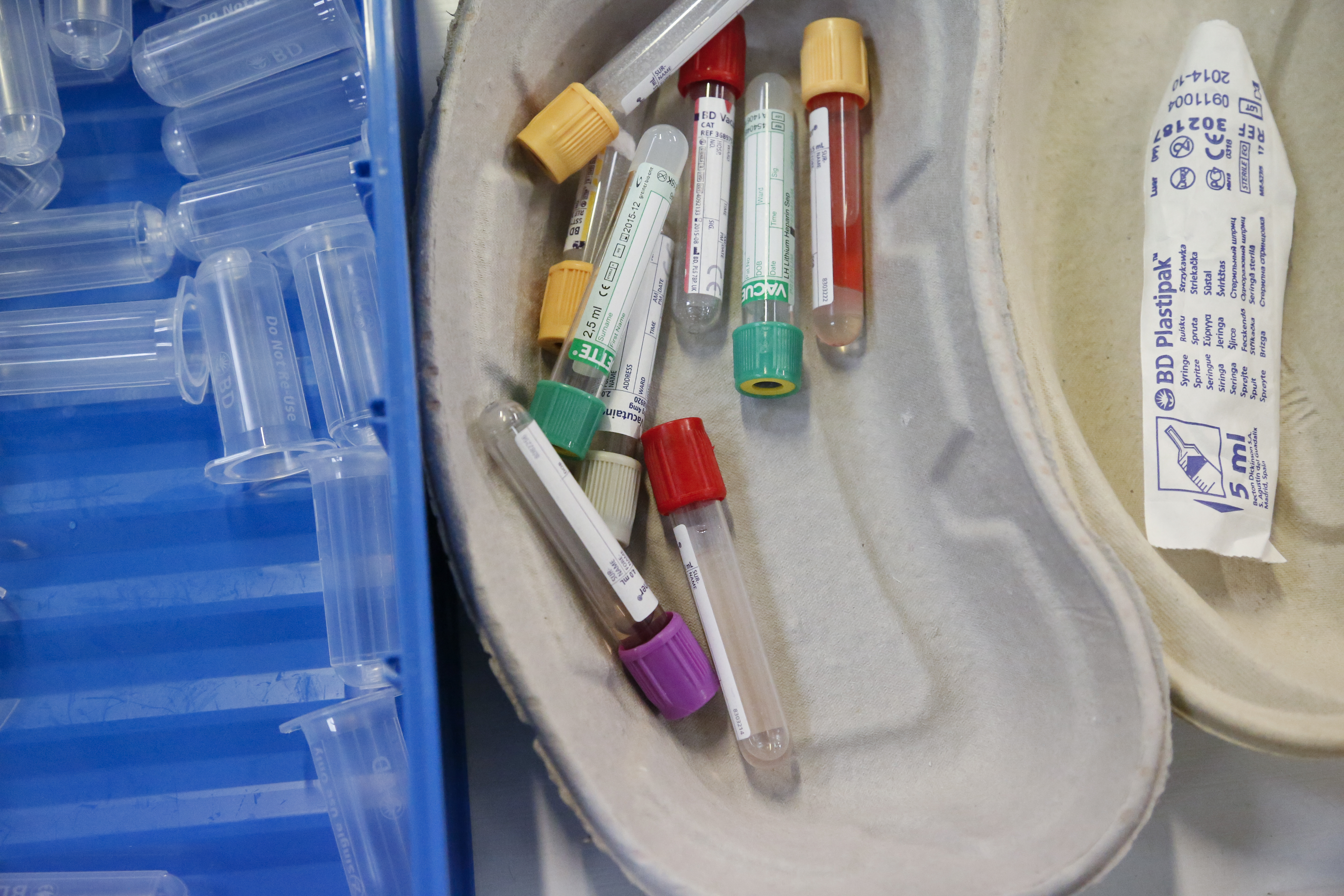
Blood collection tubes are among the basic medical supplies taken by disaster relief programs to affected areas.

Vacutainer technology was developed in 1947 by Joseph Kleiner, and is currently marketed by Becton Dickinson (B-D). The Vacutainer was preceded by other vacuum-based phlebotomy technology such as the Keidel vacuum.

The plastic tube version, known as Vacutainer PLUS, was developed at B-D in the early 1990s by E. Vogler, D. Montgomery and G. Harper amongst others of the Surface Science Group as US patents 5344611, 5326535, 5320812, 5257633 and 5246666.

Vacutainers are widely used in phlebotomy in developed countries due to safety and ease of use. Vacutainers have the advantage of being prepared with additives, allowing easy multi-tube draws, and having a lower chance of hemolysis. In developing countries, it is still common to draw blood using a syringe or syringes. Many brands have now started manufacturing Vaccutainer such as Vacu-8, Hemo Tube and Hemo Vac Plus. These tubes are now also available in pre-barcoded forms.
