= Winged infusion set =

Specialized venipuncture needle

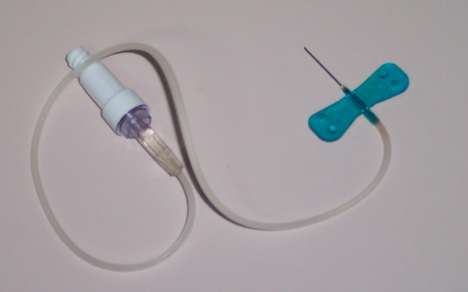
Butterfly needle

A winged infusion set—also known as "butterfly" or "scalp vein" set—is a device specialized for venipuncture: i.e. for accessing a superficial vein or artery for either intravenous injection or phlebotomy. It consists, from front to rear, of a hypodermic needle, two bilateral flexible "wings", flexible small-bore transparent tubing (often 20–35 cm long), and lastly a connector (often female Luer). This connector attaches to another device: e.g. syringe, vacuum tube holder/hub, or extension tubing from an infusion pump or gravity-fed infusion/transfusion bag/bottle.

Newer models include a slide and lock safety device slid over the needle after use, which helps prevent accidental needlestick injury and reuse of used needles, which can transmit infectious disease such as HIV and viral hepatitis.

== Use ==
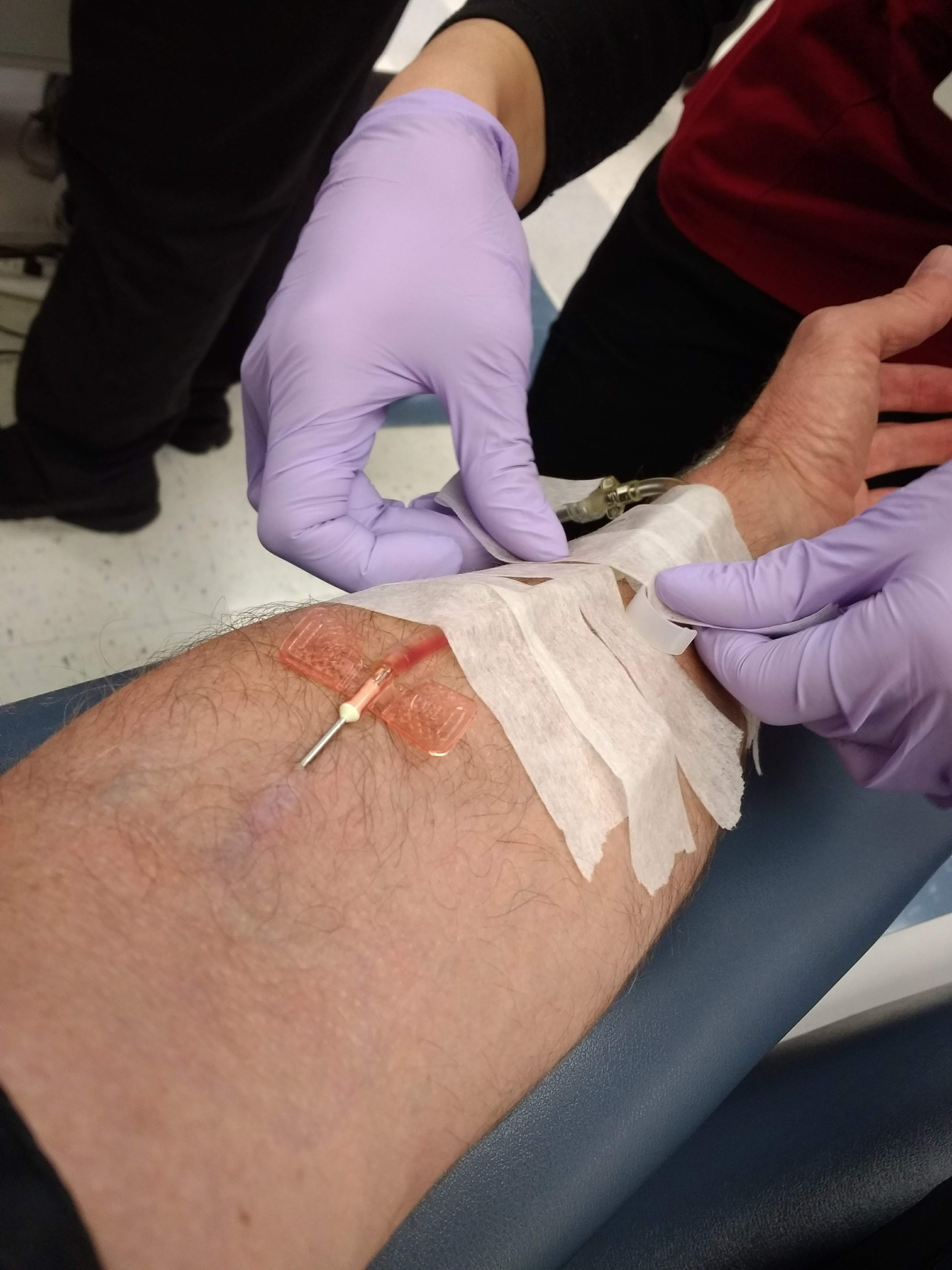
A winged infusion set on the return arm during a plateletpheresis donation.

During venipuncture, the butterfly is held by its wings between thumb and index finger. This grasp very close to the needle facilitates precise placement. The needle is generally inserted toward the vein at a shallow angle, made possible by the set's design. When the needle enters the vein, venous blood pressure generally forces a small amount of blood into the set's transparent tubing providing a visual sign, called the "flash" or "flashback", that lets the practitioner know that the needle is actually inside of a vein.

The butterfly offers advantages over a simple straight needle. The butterfly's flexible tubing reaches more body surface and tolerates more patient movement. The butterfly's precise placement facilitates venipuncture of thin, "rolling", fragile, or otherwise poorly accessible veins. The butterfly's shallow-angle insertion design facilitates venipuncture of very superficial veins, e.g. hand, wrist, or scalp veins (hence name "scalp vein" set).

== Needle size ==
Butterflies are commonly available in 18-27 gauge bore, 21G and 23G being most popular.

In phlebotomy, there is widespread avoidance of 25G and 27G butterflies based on belief that such small-bore needles hemolyze and/or clot blood samples and hence invalidate blood tests. Contrary to this belief, theoretical calculation and in vitro experiment both showed the exact opposite: namely, that shear stress and hence hemolysis decrease with decreasing needle bore (but the decrease can be clinically insignificant). In agreement with these results, a subsequent clinical trial found that 21G, 23G, and 25G butterflies connected directly to vacuum tubes caused the same amount of hemolysis and gave the same coagulation panel test results.
