= Liquid color measurement =

The color measurement of a liquid is the evaluation of that liquid's color properties. This is usually done through visual means, but can also be done by through automated means. The former provides approximate data, while the latter can provide objective data on the color properties of any given liquid.

== Measurement ==
Visual color measurement is the conventional and usual form of liquid color measurement. In this case the sample is held up to a series of color standards in order to see which standard the sample most closely resembles. This measurement is only approximate, but is the less expensive method as the only expense is the set of color standards to which the sample is matched. This is by far the most commonly used method because of this inexpensive nature.

Automated color measurement is a newer method of liquid color measurement. In this case the sample is contained in a test tube; the tube is inserted into the instrument, and the color properties of the liquid read out on a screen. This method can provide objective measurements, but is far more expensive than a set of color standards. This method is used less frequently because of how expensive it is. There is also an automated method which compares a sample to its standard, also providing objective measurement.
