= Serum-separating tube =

Test tubes used with blood

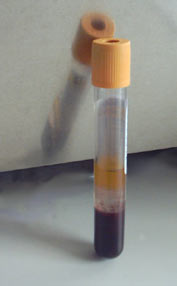
A large SST II vacutainer

A serum-separating tube or serum separator tube (SST) is a test tube used in clinical chemistry tests requiring blood serum.

SSTs are sometimes called "gold-topped tubes", "tiger-tops", or "marble-top tubes", referring to the colored stoppers which are either gold, red with a gold ring on top, or marbled red and grey. Stoppers on SPS (sodium polyanethol sulfonate) tubes have a paler yellow color, sometimes causing confusion; these are known as "yellow tops", not "gold". Trademarked versions of the SST include Covidien "Corvac" tubes.

== Features ==
The tubes have micronized silica particles which help clot the blood before centrifugation, and a gel at the bottom which separates whole blood cells from serum. Silica nanoparticles induce coagulation through contact activation of coagulation factor XII (Hageman factor). After the blood sample is centrifuged, the clear serum should be removed for testing.

== Use ==
These tubes should be used with care when measuring drug or hormone levels because the drug or hormone may diffuse from the serum into the gel, causing a reduction in measured level. The gel in SST II tubes (which appears slightly less opaque) is supposed to have less effect on drug levels in serum.

Blood samples should be allowed time to form a clot at room temperature for 30–60 min.

CDC recommends a range of time to allow clot formation that was reasonably consistent, from a minimum of 30 min to 60 min maximum.

== See also ==
- Vacutainer
- Venipuncture
