= Keidel vacuum =

Type of blood collecting device

The Keidel vacuum tube was a type of blood collecting device, first manufactured by Hynson, Wescott and Dunning in around 1922. This vacuum was one of the first evacuated systems, predating the more well known Vacutainer. Its primary use was to test for syphilis and typhoid fever.

== Process ==
Essentially, the Keidel vacuum consists of a sealed ampule with or without a culture medium. Connected to the ampule was a short rubber tube with a needle at the end, using a small glass tube as a cap. The insertion of the needle into the vein crushes the ampule, thus creating a vacuum and forcing blood into the container. Typically, a prominent vein in the forearm such as the median cubital vein would suffice, although the Keidel vacuum can take blood for any prominent peripheral vein. This concept did not become popular until during World War II, when quick and efficient first aid care was necessary in the battle field. As a result, the vacutainer became the forefront device used for blood collection.

== See also ==
- Phlebotomy
- Fingerprick
