= Test tube holder =

Equipment to hold a test tube when it should not be touched

A test tube holder is used to hold test tubes. It is used for holding a test tube in place when the tube is hot or should not be touched. For example, a test tube holder can be used to hold a test tube while it is being heated. Moreover, when heating the tube with liquid or solid contained inside, the holder ought to tightly hold a test tube in order for the tube to be safely held while heating.

Particularly, for liquid heating, when holding a test tube holder with a test tube, hold it such that it aligns with the lab bench and also point the open end of the tube away from yourself or anyone nearby.

Additionally, while using a test tube holder, the proper distance between the test tube holder and the top of the test tube is approximately 3 centimetres.

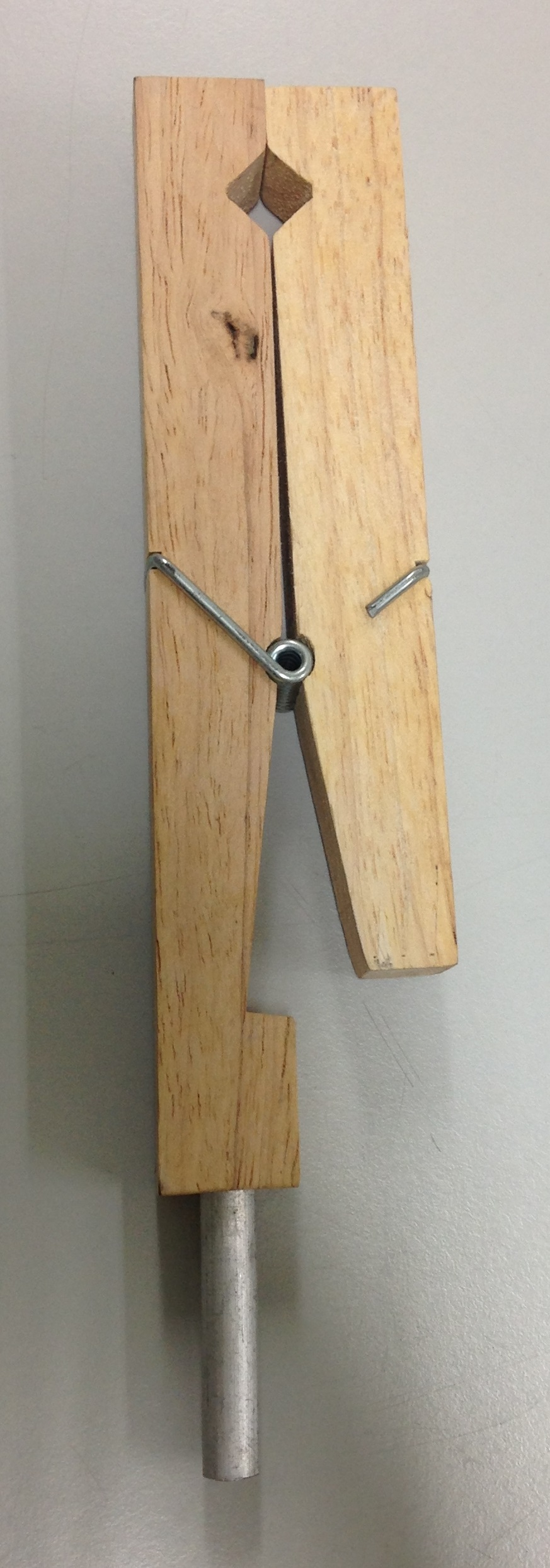
A wooden test tube holder

== Structure ==
Structurally, jaws of a test tube holder are self-closed by a spring and can be manually adjusted.

== Purpose ==
The purpose of a test tube holder is to be used only to hold a test tube as it is not structured for flasks or other heavier objects. It also is used when wanting to burn something small that cannot be held using your hand.

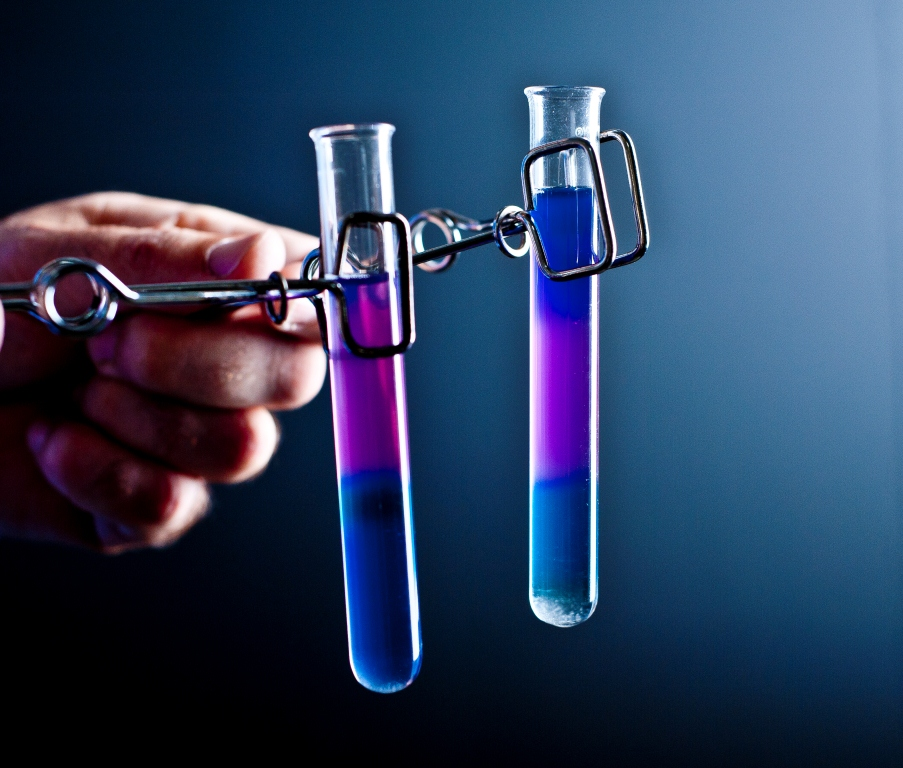
A metal test tube holder

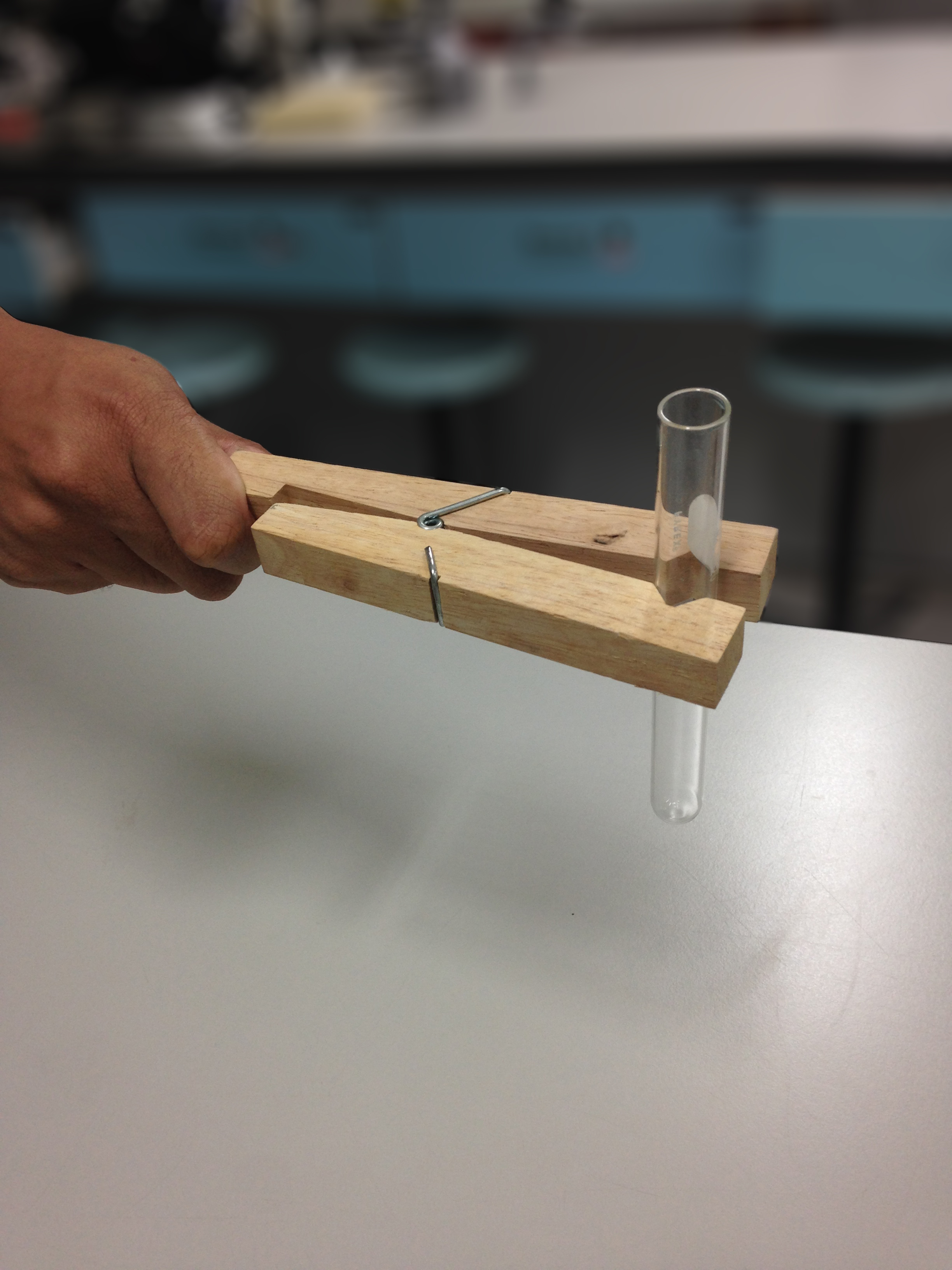
A wooden test tube holder

== See also ==
- Test tube
- Test tube rack
