= Test tube rack =

Laboratory equipment

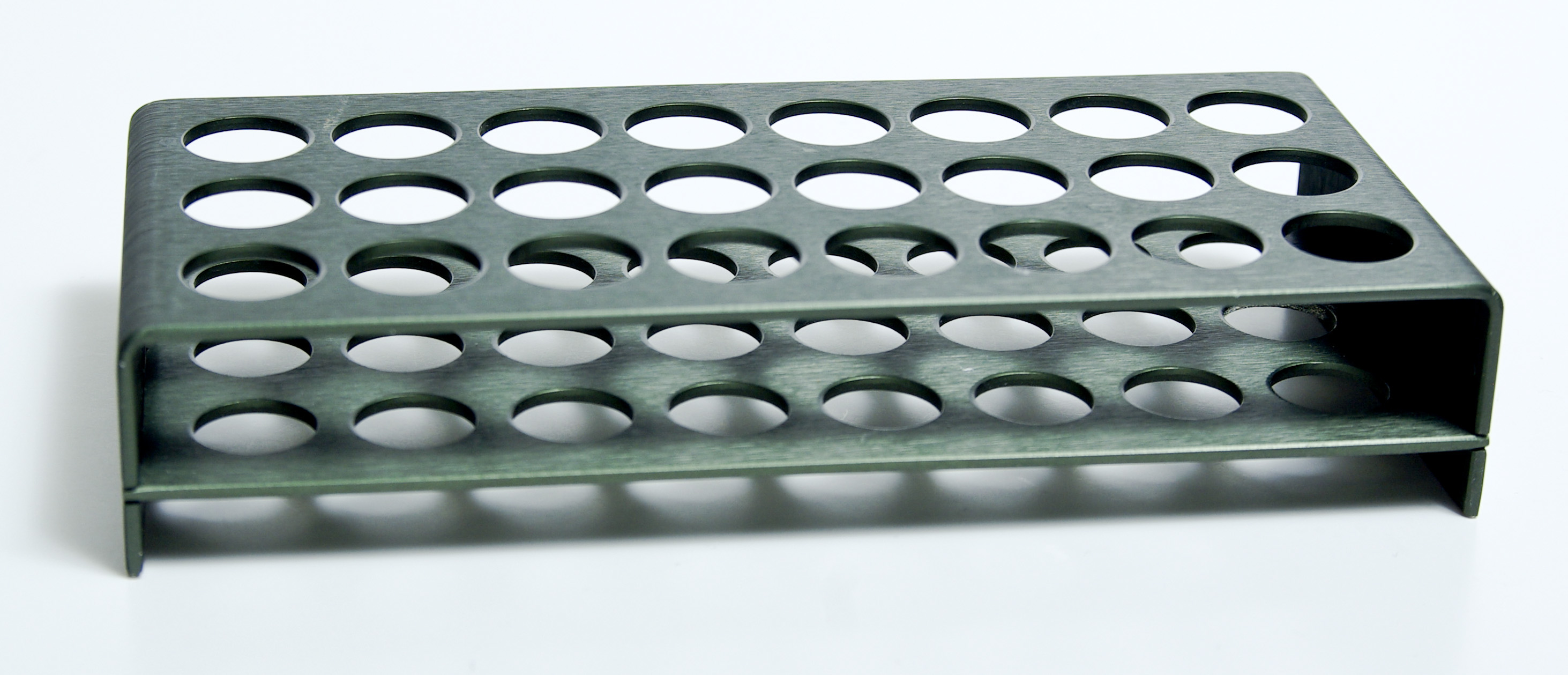
Test Tube Rack

Test tube racks are laboratory equipment used to hold upright multiple test tubes at the same time. They are most commonly used when various different solutions are needed to work with simultaneously, for safety reasons, for safe storage of test tubes, and to ease the transport of multiple tubes. Test tube racks also ease the organization of test tubes and provide support for the test tubes being worked with.

== Types ==
Test tube racks come in a variety of size, composition, material, and color. The variety of test tube racks increases the number of circumstances they can be used in whether it is to be placed in an autoclave, or to be placed in the refrigerator. The racks are most commonly made of metal wires, but they can also be found as plastic, polystyrene, foam, fiberglass, and polypropylene. Test tube racks come in the form of a classic rack, an interlocking cube form, a stack-able form, test tube drying rack, slant rack, and 1-well rack.

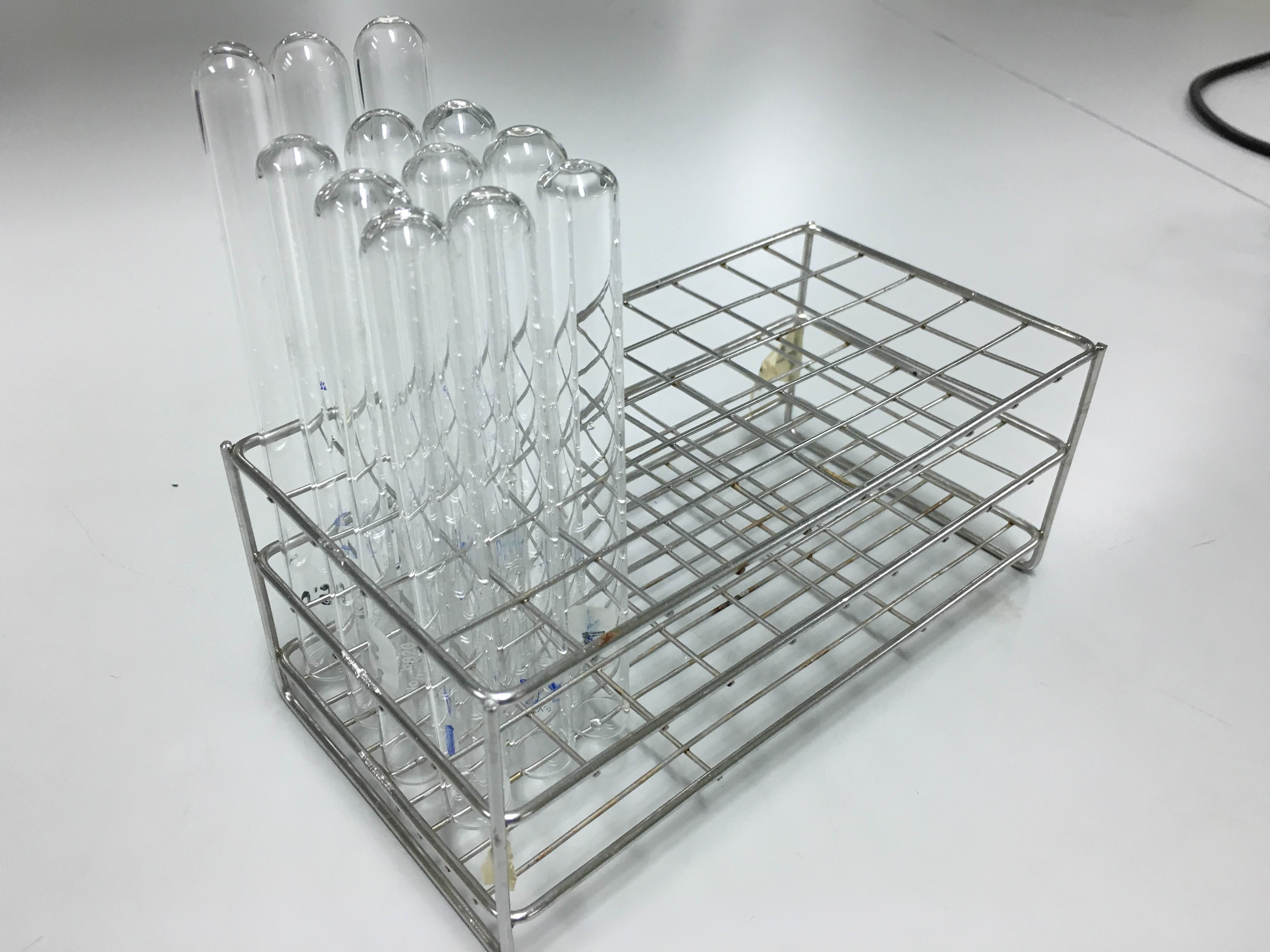
Classic Test Tube Rack

=== Classic rack ===
The classic racks are normally found in any regular laboratory and are made of wood, stainless steel, or plastic. It generally has 8 holes, 10 holes, or 12 holes to keep test tubes.

=== Interlocking cube form ===
This form of test tube racks consists of several cubes of racks that are detachable and twist-able based on the side that is needed for use. Each cube can hold one size of test tubes but each of the four sides of the cube holds the tubes in various arrangements that can be adjusted for use accordingly. These racks can not only be used for test tubes, but it can also be used to hold culture tubes, centrifuge tubes, and micro-centrifuge tubes. The interlocking cube racks can also be put in the autoclave, as well as ease the transport of multiple different sized tubes.

=== Stackable rack ===
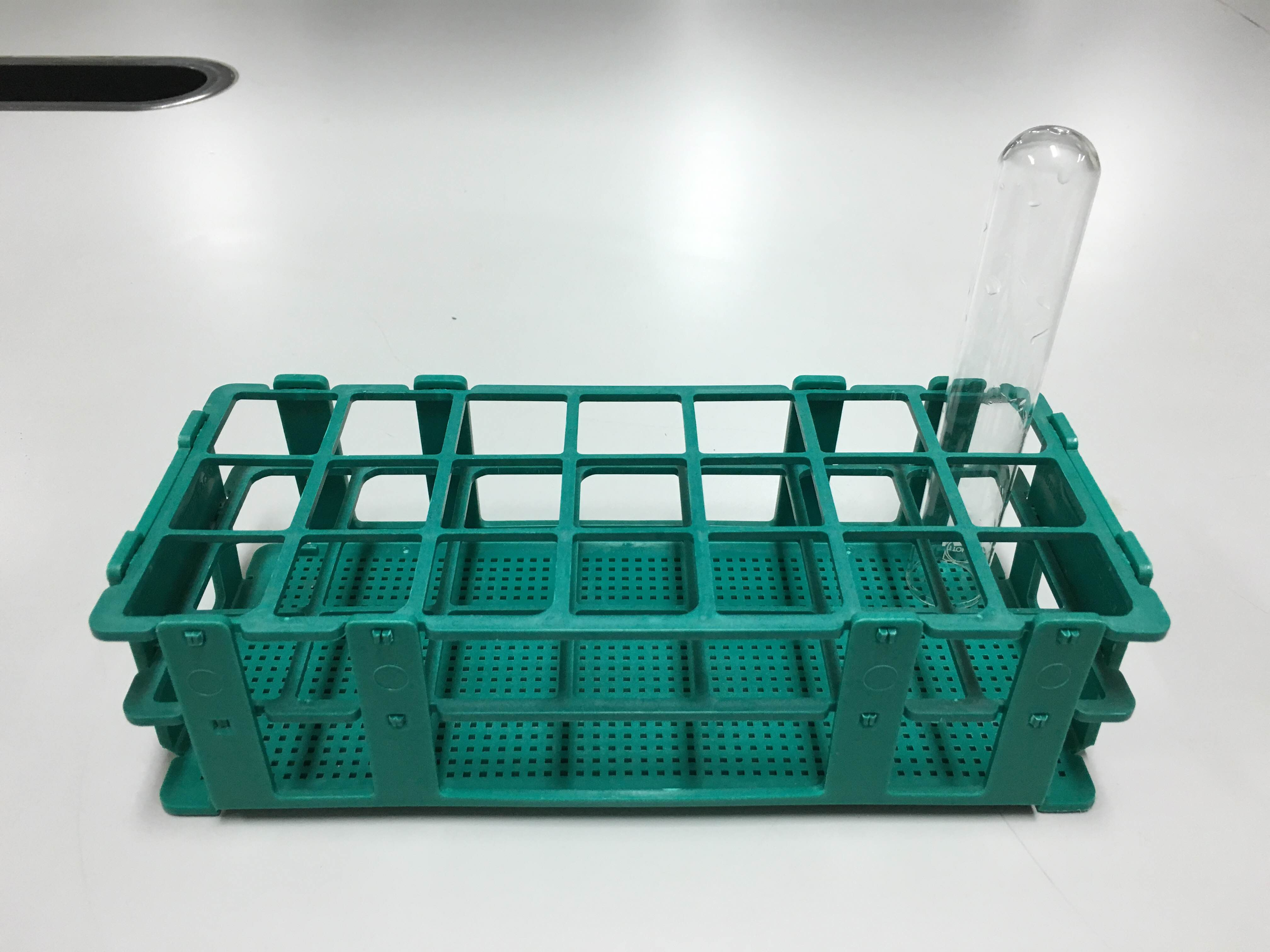
Stackable Test Tube Rack

Stackable racks are made of polypropylene and can be placed in the autoclave as well. Using a secondary frame or chassis these racks that otherwise appear as the classic test tube racks can be placed one on top of the other.

=== Test tube drying rack ===
Drying Racks can be used for various purposes, including drying and holding chromatography plates, as well as drying test tubes by placing them in an inverted position in the pegs. Placing the test tubes in an inverted position not only aids in drying, but it also minimizes the accumulation of airborne contaminants and other substances. Additionally, the drying racks are usually made of polypropylene and can be placed in the autoclave.

=== Slant rack ===
Slant racks are used to hold the slants at the degree it is required to be placed in to be dried after the media has been inserted into the tube. It is also used to incubate certain liquid cultures at an angle so that all the tubes are uniform.

=== 1-well rack ===
The 1 well rack is designed to hold only one test tube or any tube that fits in the space. It is normally made of epoxy-coated steel wire but can also be made of polystyrene. The racks made from polystyrene are friction-fit and can only hold tubes that match in size to the rack. These racks are autoclavable and can hold both conical or round bottom tubes.

=== Vial racks ===
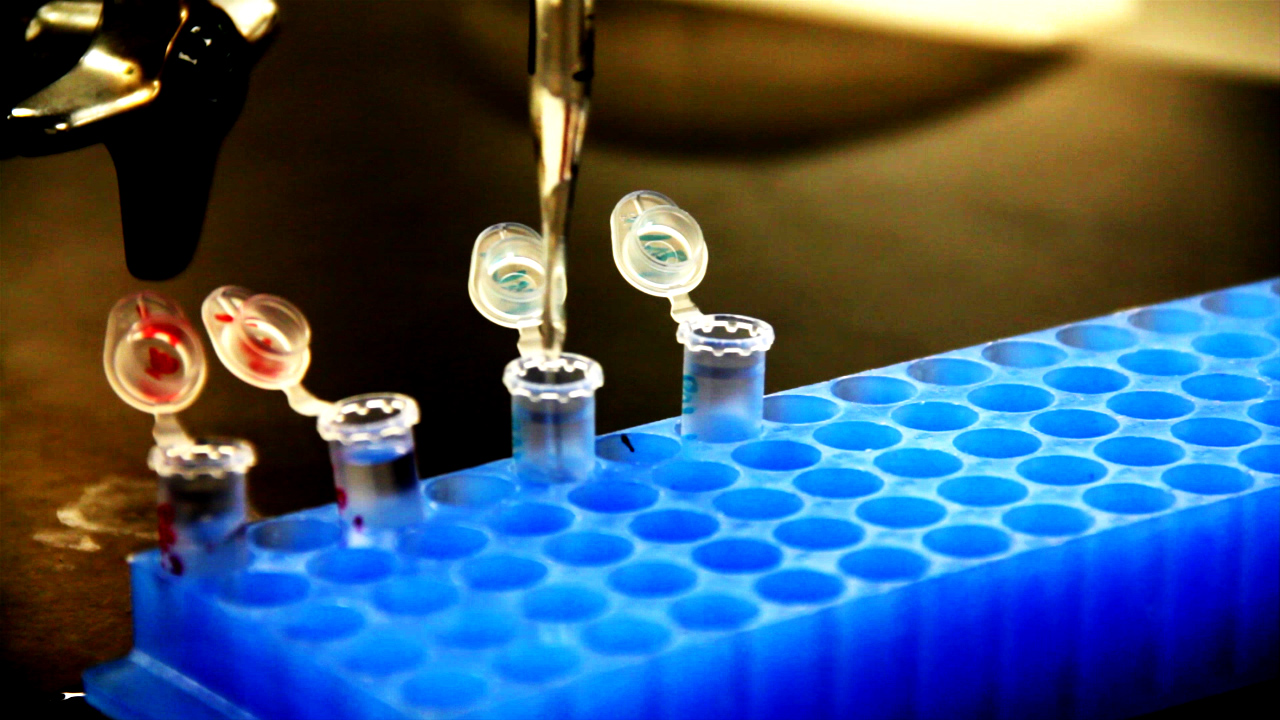
Hinge-top vials being filled by pipette on a plastic vial rack.

This type of rack is designed for much smaller plastic vials. It is often made out of plastic.

== See also ==
- Test tube
- Test tube holder
