= Acid-citrate-dextrose =

Anticoagulant solution often used in blood samples

Acid-citrate-dextrose or acid-citrate-dextrose solution (ACD; also known as anticoagulant-citrate-dextrose or anticoagulant-citrate-dextrose solution) is any solution of citric acid, sodium citrate, and dextrose in water. It is mainly used as an anticoagulant (in yellow top tubes) to preserve blood specimens required for tissue typing. It is also used during procedures such as plasmapheresis instead of heparin.

== Formulation ==
Two solutions (A and B) are defined by the United States Pharmacopeia. They have the following properties:

Content of USP ACD solutions, per 1000 mL
Substance	ACD-A amount (g)	ACD-B amount (g)
Total Citrate (as citric acid, anhydrous (C_{6}H_{8}O_{7}))	20.59 to 22.75g	12.37 to 13.67g
Dextrose (C_{6}H_{12}O_{6}*H_{2}O)	23.28g to 25.73g	13.96 to 15.44g
Sodium (Na)	4.90g to 5.42g	2.94 to 3.25g

To make use:

Substance	Amount for ACD-A	Amount for ACD-B
Citric acid, anhydrous (C_{6}H_{8}O_{7})	7.3 g	4.4 g
Sodium citrate, dihydrate	22.0 g	13.2 g
Dextrose, monohydrate (C_{6}H_{12}O_{6}*H_{2}O)	24.5 g	14.7 g
Water for injection to make	1000 mL	1000 mL

Dissolve the ingredients and mix. Filter until clear.

== History ==
=== Blood storage ===
ACD was invented by Loutit et al. in 1943 for preserving whole blood. They found that the mixture offers better red blood cell survival than the then state-of-the-art, MRC 1940 (trisodium citrate plus glucose). The old solution also caramelize when autoclaved, while the new one does not due to higher acidity. As a result, blood can now be stored for much longer, up to 21 days.

ACD was developed into CPD (citrate-phosphate-dextrose) in 1957, a version with phosphate added intended to reduce phosphate leakage from red blood cells. It does not improve shelf life appreciably, but patient recovery is improved. A later improvement was CPD with adenine (CPDA-1), which boosted RBC survival to five weeks when combined with plastic bags. CPD, in combination with adenine-mannitol additives such as SAGM, is the current blood bank preservative as of 2012.

Although human blood is generally stored using newer formulations, the uptake of such technology is slower in veterinary medicine. From experimentation on horse and donkey blood, it does seem that the newer human-blood storage technogies also translate to improvements in animal blood storage.

=== Apheresis ===
ACD is first described for use in apheresis in 1977. Citrate, typically in the form of ACD solutions, is now preferred over heparin because it is cheap, safe, and cleared out of the system faster. Use of ACD is universal for centrifuge-based systems, while membrane systems may use either. Heparin is still used for high-volume procedures, as infusing too much citrate with the returned blood can cause toxicity from the chelating action, mainly hypocalcemia.
