= Potassium oxalate =

Names
- Other names: Dipotassium oxalate; Dipotassium ethanedioate; Neutral potassium oxalate

Identifiers
CAS Number	583-52-8; monohydrate: 6487-48-5
3D model (JSmol)	Interactive image; monohydrate: Interactive image
ChemSpider	10933; monohydrate: 2006348
ECHA InfoCard	100.008.644
EC Number	209-506-8; monohydrate: 613-722-1
PubChem CID	11413; monohydrate: 2724193
UNII	LC7F2W7I5B; monohydrate: 6S7F3685W2
CompTox Dashboard (EPA)	DTXSID6060393; monohydrate: DTXSID90983454
- InChI: InChI=1S/C2H2O4.2K/c3-1(4)2(5)6;;/h(H,3,4)(H,5,6);;/q;2*+1/p-2 Key: IRXRGVFLQOSHOH-UHFFFAOYSA-L; monohydrate: InChI=1S/C2H2O4.2K.H2O/c3-1(4)2(5)6;;;/h(H,3,4)(H,5,6);;;1H2/q;2*+1;/p-2 Key: QCPTVXCMROGZOL-UHFFFAOYSA-L
- SMILES: C(=O)(C(=O)[O-])[O-].[K+].[K+]; monohydrate: C(=O)(C(=O)[O-])[O-].O.[K+].[K+]

Properties
Chemical formula	C_{2}K_{2}O_{4}
Molar mass	166.215 g·mol^{−1}
Appearance	Colorless to white crystalline solid
Density	2.13 g/cm^{3} (monohydrate)
Solubility in water	Soluble in water

Structure
Crystal structure	Orthorhombic (anhydrous)
Space group	Pbam, No. 55
- Except where otherwise noted, data are given for materials in their standard state (at 25 °C [77 °F], 100 kPa). Infobox references

Potassium oxalate is the potassium salt of oxalic acid, with the chemical formula K_{2}C_{2}O_{4}. It is a colorless to white crystalline solid that is soluble in water. The compound occurs both as an anhydrous salt and as a monohydrate, K_{2}C_{2}O_{4}·H_{2}O.

== Preparation ==
Potassium oxalate can be prepared by complete neutralization of oxalic acid with potassium hydroxide:

2 KOH + H_{2}C_{2}O_{4} → K_{2}C_{2}O_{4} + 2 H_{2}O

It can also be prepared using potassium carbonate:

K_{2}CO_{3} + H_{2}C_{2}O_{4} → K_{2}C_{2}O_{4} + CO_{2} + H_{2}O

Crystallization from aqueous solution commonly gives the monohydrate.

== Properties ==
=== Crystal structures ===
Anhydrous potassium oxalate crystallizes at room temperature in the orthorhombic crystal system, space group Pbam (No. 55), with lattice parameters a = 10.91176 Å, b = 6.11592 Å and c = 3.44003 Å, and two formula units per unit cell.

In this structure, the oxalate ion is planar.

Potassium oxalate monohydrate, K_{2}C_{2}O_{4}·H_{2}O, is monoclinic, space group C2/c (No. 15), with lattice parameters a = 9.222 Å, b = 6.197 Å, c = 10.690 Å and β = 110.70°, with four formula units per unit cell.

The water molecules form hydrogen bonds to oxalate oxygen atoms, producing hydrogen-bonded chains that are linked by potassium ions.

=== Phase transitions and thermal decomposition ===
Anhydrous potassium oxalate exhibits a solid-state phase transition on heating. The room-temperature orthorhombic form transforms to a high-temperature phase before melting.

The monohydrate loses water on heating to form anhydrous K_{2}C_{2}O_{4}. At higher temperatures, the oxalate decomposes to potassium carbonate with evolution of carbon monoxide:

K_{2}C_{2}O_{4} → K_{2}CO_{3} + CO

Thermal studies place decomposition above about 500 °C.

=== Solubility ===
Potassium oxalate is readily soluble in water. The monohydrate has a molar mass of 184.23 g/mol and a density of approximately 2.13 g/cm^{3} at room temperature.

== Uses ==
Potassium oxalate is used as a source of oxalate ions in laboratory chemistry. Because many metal oxalates are sparingly soluble, soluble oxalates can be used to precipitate metal ions, particularly calcium, from solution.

It has also been used in analytical chemistry and in preparations where oxalate is required as a complexing or precipitating ligand.

== Safety ==
Potassium oxalate is harmful if swallowed or absorbed in significant amounts. As with other soluble oxalates, toxicity is associated in part with binding of calcium ions and formation of insoluble calcium oxalate.
