= Brian Weil =

American photographer and activist

- Born: Brian Weil; 1954; Chicago, U.S.
- Died: 1996 (aged 41)
- Known for: Photography, Activism

Brian Weil (1954–1996) was a photographer, activist and writer most well known for his work on the AIDS epidemic and founding the Needle Exchange program in the Bronx. Art critic Roberta Smith wrote his New York Times obituary. The headline referred to him as the “Photographer Who Founded Needle Exchange.”

== Personal life ==
Weil was born in Chicago in 1954 where he attended Columbia College. He was a secular Jew and his father was a holocaust survivor. Weil learnt black-and-white photography from his brother, Kenneth. Shortly after he started producing 3x3 inch portraits of patients in a home for the mentally disabled. This was his first project and he finished it by the time he was 17.

In 1976, Weil moved to New York and did work documenting artworks, commercial galleries, and assisting other photographers including his friend Larry Clark.

== Career ==
Weil's first exhibition was in 1980 at the Artists Space. His photography covered many topics from Hasidic jews to sex workers. Weil was most passionate about AIDS and its effect on his city. Although his work is closely tied to his activism, the unrelated pieces received attention as well. Much of his photography was dark and grainy, he used close up angles and harsh lighting extensively. Stamatina Gregory described his photography as: "Weil's AIDS-related photos as well as earlier, freakier projects that profile fringe groups, sex nuts (e.g., an aroused man and a fish tank!), dead people, and boxers. Weil's deep engagement with his subjects should emerge through his characteristic scrim of grainy film."

The University of Arizona Center for Creative Photography describes his range of topics as such:

- AIDS (Disease) and the arts
- Bondage (Sexual behavior) in art
- Gender identity
- Gender transition
- Hasidim
- Homicide investigation
- Protest movements—United States
- Protest movements in mass media

Weil’s work is permanently held in the collections of the Jewish Museum, New York; the International Center of Photography, New York; the Museum of Fine Arts, Houston; and the Moderna Museet, Stockholm.

== AIDS activism ==
During the 1980s to 1990s he was an active member of Act Up, an AIDS activism group.

In 1985, Weil began volunteering with Gay Men’s Health Crisis (GMHC), the world’s first non-profit community organization dedicated to HIV/AIDS support services and advocacy.

In 1994, Brian Weil worked with members of Act Up and the World Health Organization to found the City Wide Needle Exchange program in New York City, which gave users access to clean needles in an attempt to prevent blood transmitted diseases.
