= Gelmini =

Gelmini is an Italian surname. Notable people with the surname include:

- Mariastella Gelmini (born 1973), Italian politician and attorney
- Pierino Gelmini (1925 – 2014), Italian Roman Catholic priest
- Marcos Paulo Gelmini Gomes, (born 1988) Brazilian footballer of partial Italian descent
