= Drug rehabilitation =

Processes of treatment for drug dependency

- ICD-9-CM: 94.64

Drug rehabilitation is the process of medical or psychotherapeutic treatment for dependency on psychoactive substances such as alcohol, prescription drugs, and street drugs such as cannabis, cocaine, heroin, and amphetamines. The general intent is to enable the patient to confront substance dependence, if present, and stop substance misuse to avoid the psychological, legal, financial, social, and medical consequences that can be caused

Treatment may include medications for substance use disorders and co-occurring medical or psychiatric conditions, counseling and behavioral therapies delivered by trained professionals, and participation in mutual-support groups with other people in recovery.

== Psychological dependency ==
Psychosocial interventions in drug rehabilitation aim to help individuals develop coping skills, modify behaviors associated with substance use, and strengthen social support networks. Many treatment programs incorporate mutual-support groups, including Twelve-step programs, as an adjunct to professional treatment. Recovery goals may emphasize either abstinence or reduced substance use, depending on the substance involved, the severity of the disorder, and individual treatment goals.

Whether moderation is an appropriate treatment goal for individuals with a history of substance misuse depends on the substance involved, the severity of the disorder, and clinical circumstances, and remains an area of ongoing research and debate.

Whether moderation is achievable by those with a history of misuse remains a controversial point.

The brain's chemical structure is altered by addictive substances and these changes are present long after an individual stops using. This change in brain structure increases the risk of relapse, making treatment an important part of the rehabilitation process.

== Types ==
Various types of programs offer help in drug rehabilitation, including residential treatment (in-patient/out-patient), local support groups, extended care centers, recovery or sober houses, addiction counselling, mental health, and medical care. Some rehab centers offer age- and gender-specific programs.

In an American survey by three separate institutions (the National Association of Alcoholism and Drug Abuse Counselors, Rational Recovery Systems and the Society of Psychologists in Addictive Behaviors) measuring treatment responses on the Spiritual Belief Scale (a scale measuring belief in the four spiritual characteristics Alcoholics Anonymous identified by Ernest Kurtz); the scores were found to explain 41% of the variance in the treatment provider's responses on the Addiction Belief Scale (a scale measuring adherence to the disease model or the free-will model addiction).

Effective treatment addresses the multiple needs of the patient rather than treating addiction alone. In addition, medically assisted drug detoxification or alcohol detoxification alone is ineffective as a treatment for addiction. The National Institute on Drug Abuse (NIDA) recommends detoxification followed by both medication (where applicable) and behavioral therapy, followed by relapse prevention. According to NIDA, effective treatment must address medical and mental health services as well as follow-up options, such as community or family-based recovery support systems. Whatever the methodology, patient motivation is an important factor in treatment success.

For individuals addicted to prescription drugs, treatments tend to be similar to those who are addicted to drugs affecting the same brain systems. Medication like methadone and buprenorphine can be used to treat addiction to prescription opioids, and behavioral therapies can be used to treat addiction to prescription stimulants, benzodiazepines, and other drugs.

Types of behavioral therapy include:

- Cognitive behavioral therapy, which seeks to help patients to recognize, avoid and cope with situations in which they are most likely to relapse.
- Multidimensional family therapy, which is designed to support the recovery of the patient by improving family functioning.
- Motivational interviewing, which is designed to increase patient motivation to change behavior and enter treatment.
- Motivational incentives, which uses positive reinforcement to encourage abstinence from the addictive substance.
- EEG Biofeedback augmented treatment improves abstinence rates of 12-step, faith-based, and medically assisted addiction for cocaine, methamphetamine, alcohol use disorder, and opioid addictions.

Treatment can be a long process and the duration is dependent upon the patient's needs and history of substance use. Research has shown that most patients need at least three months of treatment and longer durations are associated with better outcomes.

=== Medications ===
Certain opioid medications such as methadone and more buprenorphine are widely used to treat addiction and dependence on other opioids such as heroin, morphine or oxycodone. Methadone and buprenorphine are maintenance therapies intended to reduce cravings for opioids, thereby reducing illegal drug use, and the risks associated with it, such as disease, arrest, incarceration, and death, in line with the philosophy of harm reduction. Both drugs may be used as maintenance medications (taken for an indefinite period of time), or used as detoxification aids. All available studies collected in the 2005 Australian National Evaluation of Pharmacotherapies for Opioid Dependence suggest that maintenance treatment is preferable, with very high rates (79–100%) of relapse within three months of detoxification from levo-α-acetylmethadol (LAAM), buprenorphine, and methadone.

According to the National Institute on Drug Abuse (NIDA), patients stabilized on adequate, sustained doses of methadone or buprenorphine can keep their jobs, avoid crime and violence, and reduce their exposure to HIV and Hepatitis C by stopping or reducing injection drug use and drug-related high risk sexual behavior. Naltrexone is a long-acting opioid antagonist with few side effects. It is usually prescribed in outpatient medical conditions. Naltrexone blocks the euphoric effects of alcohol and opioids. Naltrexone cuts relapse risk in the first three months by about 36%. However, it is far less effective in helping patients maintain abstinence or retaining them in the drug-treatment system (retention rates average 12% at 90 days for naltrexone, average 57% at 90 days for buprenorphine, average 61% at 90 days for methadone).

Ibogaine is a hallucinogenic drug promoted by certain fringe groups to interrupt both physical dependence and psychological craving to a broad range of drugs including narcotics, stimulants, alcohol, and nicotine. To date, there have never been any controlled studies showing it to be effective, and it is not accepted as a treatment by physicians, pharmacists, or addictionologist. There have also been several deaths related to ibogaine use, which causes tachycardia and long QT syndrome. The drug is an illegal Schedule I controlled substance in the United States, and the foreign facilities in which it is administered tend to have little oversight and range from motel rooms to one moderately-sized rehabilitation center.

A few antidepressants have been proven to be helpful in the context of smoking cessation/nicotine addiction. These medications include bupropion and nortriptyline. Bupropion inhibits the re-uptake of nor-epinephrine and dopamine and has been FDA approved for smoking cessation, while nortriptyline is a tricyclic antidepressant which has been used to aid in smoking cessation it has not been FDA approved for this indication.

Acamprosate, disulfiram and topiramate (a novel anticonvulsant sulphonated sugar) are also used to treat alcohol addiction. Acamprosate has shown effectiveness for patients with severe dependence, helping them to maintain abstinence for several weeks, even months. Disulfiram produces a very unpleasant reaction when drinking alcohol that includes flushing, nausea and palpitations. It is more effective for patients with high motivation and some addicts use it only for high-risk situations. Patients who wish to continue drinking or may be likely to relapse should not take disulfiram as it can result in the disulfiram-alcohol reaction mentioned previously, which is very serious and can even be fatal.

=== Residential treatment ===
In-patient residential treatment for people with an alcohol use disorder is usually quite expensive without insurance. Most American programs follow a 28–30 day program length. The length is based solely upon providers' experience. During the 1940s, clients stayed about one week to get over the physical changes, another week to understand the program, and another week or two to become stable. 70% to 80% of American residential alcohol treatment programs provide 12-step support services. These include, but are not limited to AA, Narcotics Anonymous, Cocaine Anonymous and Al-Anon. One recent study suggests the importance of family participation in residential treatment patient retention, finding "increased program completion rate for those with a family member or significant other involved in a seven-day family program".

=== Brain implants ===
Patients with severe opioid addiction are being given brain implants to help reduce their cravings, in the first trial of its kind in the US. Treatment starts with a series of brain scans. Surgery follows with doctors making a small hole in the skull to insert a tiny 1mm electrode in the specific area of the brain that regulates impulses such as addiction and self-control. This treatment is for those who have failed every other treatment, whether that is medicine, behavioral therapy, and/or social interventions. It is a very rigorous trial with oversight from ethicists and regulators and many other governing bodies.

== Recovery ==
The definition of recovery remains divided and subjective in drug rehabilitation, as there are no set standards for measuring recovery. The Betty Ford Institute defined recovery as achieving complete abstinence as well as personal well-being while other studies have considered "near abstinence" as a definition.

The Recovery Model originates in the psychiatric survivor movement in the US, which argues that receiving a certain diagnoses can be stigmatizing and disempowering. Some characteristics of the Recovery Model are social inclusion, empowerment to overcome substance use, focusing on strengths of the client instead of their deficits and providing help living more fulfilling lives in the presence of symptoms of addiction. Another key component of the Recovery Model is the collaborative relationship between client and provider in developing the client's path to abstinence. Under the Recovery Model a program is personally designed to meet an individual clients needs, and does not include a standard set of steps one must go through.

The Recovery Model uses integral theory: a four-part approach focusing on the individual, the collective society, along with individual and external factors. The four quadrants corresponding with each in Integral Theory are Consciousness, Behavior, Culture and Systems. Quadrant One deals with the neurological aspect of addiction. Quadrant Two focuses on building self-esteem and a feeling of connectedness, sometimes through spirituality. Quadrant three works on mending the "eroded relationships" caused by active addiction. Quadrant Four often involves facing the harsh consequences of drug use such as unemployment, legal discrepancies, or eviction. The use of integral theory aims to break the dichotomy of "using" or "not using" and focuses instead on emotional, spiritual, and intellectual growth, along with physical wellness.

== Criminal justice ==
Drug rehabilitation is sometimes part of the criminal justice system. People convicted of minor drug offenses may be sentenced to rehabilitation instead of prison, and those convicted of driving while intoxicated are sometimes required to attend Alcoholics Anonymous meetings. There are a great number of ways to address an alternative sentence in a drug possession or DUI case; increasingly, American courts are willing to explore outside-the-box methods for delivering this service. There have been lawsuits filed, and won, regarding the requirement of attending Alcoholics Anonymous and other twelve-step meetings as being inconsistent with the Establishment Clause of the First Amendment of the U.S. Constitution, mandating separation of church and state.

In some cases, individuals can be court-ordered to drug rehabilitation by the state through legislation like the Marchman Act.

== Counseling ==
Traditional addiction treatment is based primarily on counseling.

Counselors help individuals with identifying behaviors and problems related to their addiction. It can be done on an individual basis, but it's more common to find it in a group setting and can include crisis counseling, weekly or daily counseling, and drop-in counseling supports. Counselors are trained to develop recovery programs that help to reestablish healthy behaviors and provide coping strategies whenever a situation of risk happens. It's very common to see them also work with family members who are affected by the addictions of the individual, or in a community to prevent addiction and educate the public. Counselors should be able to recognize how addiction affects the whole person and those around him or her. Counseling is also related to "Intervention"; a process in which the addict's family and loved ones request help from a professional to get an individual into drug treatment.

This process begins with a professionals' first goal: breaking down denial of the person with the addiction. Denial implies a lack of willingness from the patients or fear to confront the true nature of the addiction and to take any action to improve their lives, instead of continuing the destructive behavior. Once this has been achieved, the counselor coordinates with the addict's family to support them in getting the individual to drug rehabilitation immediately, with concern and care for this person. Otherwise, this person will be asked to leave and expect no support of any kind until going into drug rehabilitation or alcoholism treatment. An intervention can also be conducted in the workplace environment with colleagues instead of family.

=== Twelve-step programs ===
The disease model of addiction has long contended the maladaptive patterns of alcohol and substance use displays addicted individuals are the result of a lifelong disease that is biological in origin and exacerbated by environmental contingencies. This conceptualization renders the individual essentially powerless over his or her problematic behaviors and unable to remain sober by himself or herself, much as individuals with a terminal illness are unable to fight the disease by themselves without medication. Behavioral treatment, therefore, necessarily requires individuals to admit their addiction, renounce their former lifestyle, and seek a supportive social network that can help them remain sober. Such approaches are the quintessential features of Twelve-step programs, originally published in the book Alcoholics Anonymous in 1939. These approaches have met considerable amounts of criticism, coming from opponents who disapprove of the spiritual-religious orientation on both psychological and legal grounds. Opponents also contend that it lacks valid scientific evidence for claims of efficacy. However, there is survey-based research that suggests there is a correlation between attendance and alcohol sobriety. Different results have been reached for other drugs, with the twelve steps being less beneficial for addicts to illicit substances, and least beneficial to those addicted to the physiologically and psychologically addicting opioids, for which maintenance therapies are the gold standard of care.

=== SMART Recovery ===
SMART Recovery was founded by Joe Gerstein in 1994 by basing REBT as a foundation. It gives importance to the human agency in overcoming addiction and focuses on self-empowerment and self-reliance. It does not subscribe to disease theory and powerlessness. The group meetings involve open discussions, questioning decisions and forming corrective measures through assertive exercises. It does not involve a lifetime membership concept, but people can opt to attend meetings, and choose not to after gaining recovery. Objectives of the SMART Recovery programs are:

- Building and Maintaining Motivation,
- Coping with Urges,
- Managing Thoughts, Feelings, and Behaviors,
- Living a Balanced Life.

This is considered to be similar to other self-help groups who work within mutual aid concepts.

=== Client-centered approaches ===
In his influential book, Client-Centered Therapy, in which he presented the client-centered approach to therapeutic change, psychologist Carl Rogers proposed there are three necessary and sufficient conditions for personal change: unconditional positive regard, accurate empathy, and genuineness. Rogers believed the presence of these three items, in the therapeutic relationship, could help an individual overcome any troublesome issue, including but not limited to alcohol use disorder. To this end, a 1957 study compared the relative effectiveness of three different psychotherapies in treating alcoholics who had been committed to a state hospital for sixty days: a therapy based on two-factor learning theory, client-centered therapy, and psychoanalytic therapy. Though the authors expected the two-factor theory to be the most effective, it actually proved to be deleterious in the outcome. Surprisingly, client-centered therapy proved most effective. It has been argued, however, these findings may be attributable to the profound difference in therapist outlook between the two-factor and client-centered approaches, rather than to client-centered techniques. The authors note two-factor theory involves stark disapproval of the clients' "irrational behavior" (p. 350); this notably negative outlook could explain the results.

A variation of Rogers' approach has been developed in which clients are directly responsible for determining the goals and objectives of the treatment. Known as Client-Directed Outcome-Informed therapy (CDOI), this approach has been utilized by several drug treatment programs, such as Arizona's Department of Health Services.

=== Psychoanalysis ===
Psychoanalysis, a psychotherapeutic approach to behavior change developed by Sigmund Freud and modified by his followers, has also explained substance use. This orientation suggests the main cause of the addiction syndrome is the unconscious need to entertain and to enact various kinds of homosexual and perverse fantasies, and at the same time to avoid taking responsibility for this. It is hypothesized specific drugs facilitate specific fantasies and using drugs is considered to be a displacement from, and a concomitant of, the compulsion to masturbate while entertaining homosexual and perverse fantasies. The addiction syndrome is also hypothesized to be associated with life trajectories that have occurred within the context of teratogenic processes, the phases of which include social, cultural, and political factors, encapsulation, traumatophobia, and masturbation as a form of self-soothing. Such an approach lies in stark contrast to the approaches of social cognitive theory to addiction—and indeed, to behavior in general—which holds human beings to regulate and control their own environmental and cognitive environments, and are not merely driven by internal, driving impulses. Additionally, homosexual content is not implicated as a necessary feature in addiction.

=== Relapse prevention ===
An influential cognitive-behavioral approach to addiction recovery and therapy has been Alan Marlatt's (1985) Relapse Prevention approach. Marlatt describes four psycho-social processes relevant to the addiction and relapse processes: self-efficacy, outcome expectancy, attributions of causality, and decision-making processes. Self-efficacy refers to one's ability to deal competently and effectively with high-risk, relapse-provoking situations. Outcome expectancy refers to an individual's expectations about the psychoactive effects of an addictive substance. Attributions of causality refer to an individual's pattern of beliefs that relapse to drug use is a result of internal, or rather external, transient causes (e.g., allowing oneself to make exceptions when faced with what are judged to be unusual circumstances). Finally, decision-making processes are implicated in the relapse process as well. Substance use is the result of multiple decisions whose collective effects result in the consumption of the intoxicant. Furthermore, Marlatt stresses some decisions—referred to as apparently irrelevant decisions—may seem inconsequential to relapse, but may actually have downstream implications that place the user in a high-risk situation.

For example: As a result of heavy traffic, a recovering alcoholic may decide one afternoon to exit the highway and travel on side roads. This will result in the creation of a high-risk situation when he realizes he is inadvertently driving by his old favorite bar. If this individual can employ successful coping strategies, such as distracting himself from his cravings by turning on his favorite music, then he will avoid the relapse risk (PATH 1) and heighten his efficacy for future abstinence. If, however, he lacks coping mechanisms—for instance, he may begin ruminating on his cravings (PATH 2)—then his efficacy for abstinence will decrease, his expectations of positive outcomes will increase, and he may experience a lapse—an isolated return to substance intoxication. So doing results in what Marlatt refers to as the Abstinence Violation Effect, characterized by guilt for having gotten intoxicated and low efficacy for future abstinence in similar tempting situations. This is a dangerous pathway, Marlatt proposes, to full-blown relapse.

=== Cognitive therapy ===
An additional cognitively-based model of substance use recovery has been offered by Aaron Beck, the father of cognitive therapy and championed in his 1993 book Cognitive Therapy of Substance Abuse. This therapy rests upon the assumption addicted individuals possess core beliefs, often not accessible to immediate consciousness (unless the patient is also depressed). These core beliefs, such as "I am undesirable," activate a system of addictive beliefs that result in imagined anticipatory benefits of substance use and, consequentially, craving. Once craving has been activated, permissive beliefs ("I can handle getting high just this one more time") are facilitated. Once a permissive set of beliefs have been activated, then the individual will activate drug-seeking and drug-ingesting behaviors. The cognitive therapist's job is to uncover this underlying system of beliefs, analyze it with the patient, and thereby demonstrate its dysfunction. As with any cognitive-behavioral therapy, homework assignments and behavioral exercises serve to solidify what is learned and discussed during treatment.

=== Emotion regulation and mindfulness ===
A growing literature is demonstrating the importance of emotion regulation in the treatment of substance use. Considering that nicotine and other psychoactive substances such as cocaine activate similar psycho-pharmacological pathways, an emotion regulation approach may be applicable to a wide array of substance use. Proposed models of affect-driven tobacco use have focused on negative reinforcement as the primary driving force for addiction; according to such theories, tobacco is used because it helps one escape from the undesirable effects of nicotine withdrawal or other negative moods. Acceptance and commitment therapy (ACT), is showing evidence that it is effective in treating substance use, including the treatment of polysubstance use disorder and tobacco smoking. Mindfulness programs that encourage patients to be aware of their own experiences in the present moment and of emotions that arise from thoughts, appear to prevent impulsive/compulsive responses. Research also indicates that mindfulness programs can reduce the consumption of substances such as alcohol, cocaine, amphetamines, marijuana, cigarettes and opioids.

=== Dual diagnosis ===
People who are diagnosed with a mental health disorder and a simultaneous substance use disorder are known as having a dual diagnosis. For example, someone with bipolar disorder who also has an alcohol use disorder would have dual diagnosis. On such occasions, two treatment plans are needed with the mental health disorder requiring treatment first. According to the National Survey on Drug Use and Health (NSDUH), 45 percent of people with addiction have a co-occurring mental health disorder.

== Behavioral models ==
Behavioral models make use of principles of functional analysis of drinking behavior. Behavior models exist for both working with the person using the substance (community reinforcement approach) and their family (community reinforcement approach and family training). Both these models have had considerable research success for both efficacy and effectiveness. This model lays much emphasis on the use of problem-solving techniques as a means of helping the addict to overcome his/her addiction.

The way researchers think about how addictions are formed shapes the models we have. Four main Behavioral Models of addiction exist: the Moral Model, Disease Model, Socio-Cultural Model and Psycho-dynamic Model. The Moral Model of addiction theorizes that addiction is a moral weakness and that it is the sole fault of the person for becoming addicted. Supporters of the Moral Model view drug use as a choice, even for those who are addicted, and addicts as people of bad character. Disease Model of addiction frames substance abuse as 'a chronic relapsing disease that changes the structure and function of the brain'. Research conducted on the neurobiological factors of addiction has proven to have mixed results, and the only treatment idea it offers is abstinence. The Socio-Cultural Model tries to provide an explanation of how certain populations are more susceptible to substance abuse than others. It focuses on how discrimination, poor quality of life, lack of opportunity and other problems common in marginalized communities can make them vulnerable to addiction. The Psycho-Dynamic Model looks at trauma and mental illness as a precursor to addiction. Many rehabilitation centers treat "co-occurring" disorders, which refer to substance abuse disorder paired with a mental health diagnosis.

== Barriers to treatment in the US ==
Barriers to accessing drug treatment may worsen negative health outcomes and further exacerbate health inequalities in the United States. Stigmatization of drug use, the war on drugs and criminalization, and the social determinants of health should all be considered when discussing access to drug treatment and potential barriers.

Broad categories of barriers to drug treatment are: absences of problem, negative social support, fear of treatment, privacy concerns, time conflict, poor treatment availability, and admission difficulty. Other barriers to treatment include high costs, lack of tailored programs to address specific needs, and prerequisites that require participants to be house, abstinent from all substances, and/or employed. (See low-threshold treatment and housing first for more context on the latter point.)

=== Loss of Child/Dependent Access ===
In certain states, providers due to mandatory reporting methods and guidelines inform Child Protective Services of substance abusing parents for Schedule 1 substances including cannabis/marijuana. If a mother tests positive for using the substance during pregnancy in South Carolina she may be required to forfeit her child.

Further, barriers to treatment can vary depending on the geographical location, gender, race, socioeconomic status, and status of past or current criminal justice system involvement of the person seeking treatment.

== Criticism ==
Despite ongoing efforts to combat addiction, there has been evidence of clinics billing patients for treatments that may not guarantee their recovery. This is a major problem as there are numerous claims of fraud in drug rehabilitation centers, where these centers are billing insurance companies for under-delivering much-needed medical treatment while exhausting patients' insurance benefits. In California, there are movements and laws regarding this matter, particularly the California Insurance Fraud Prevention Act (IFPA) which declares it unlawful to unknowingly conduct such businesses.

Under the Affordable Care Act and the Mental Health Parity Act, rehabilitation centers are able to bill insurance companies for substance use treatment. With long wait lists in limited state-funded rehabilitation centers, controversial private centers rapidly emerged. One popular model, known as the Florida Model for rehabilitation centers, is often criticized for fraudulent billing to insurance companies. Under the guise of helping patients with opioid addiction, these centers would offer addicts free rent or up to $500 per month to stay in their "sober homes", then charge insurance companies as high as $5,000 to $10,000 per test for simple urine tests. Little attention is paid to patients in terms of addiction intervention as these patients have often been known to continue drug use during their stay in these centers. Since 2015, these centers have been under federal and state criminal investigation. As of 2017 in California, there are only 16 investigators in the CA Department of Health Care Services investigating over 2,000 licensed rehab centers.

== By country ==
=== Afghanistan ===
In Afghanistan since the Taliban took power in 2021, they have forced drug addicts into compulsory drug rehabilitation. in October 2021, France 24 reported an incident where armed Taliban fighters forced 20 addicts under a bridge in Kabul into a rehabilitation ambulance at gunpoint, including prodding them with the barrel of their guns and firing into the air.

=== China ===
As of 2013 China has compulsory drug rehabilitation centers. It was reported in 2018 1.3 million drug addicts were treated in China's compulsory detox centers.

Compulsory drug rehabilitation has a long history in China: The Mao Zedong government is credited with eradicating both consumption and production of opium during the 1950s using unrestrained repression and social reform. Ten million addicts were forced into compulsory treatment, dealers were executed, and opium-producing regions were planted with new crops. Remaining opium production shifted south of the Chinese border into the Golden Triangle region.

=== India ===
In India, consumption of narcotic drugs is an offence under section 27 of the Narcotic Drugs and Psychotropic Substances Act, 1985, but section 64A provides that an addict charged with consumption or possession of a small quantity who voluntarily undergoes treatment at a hospital or institution maintained or recognised by the government is immune from prosecution. The immunity can be withdrawn if the person does not complete the treatment. In 2025–26 the state government of Punjab reported that more than 10,000 people had been granted this immunity and admitted to government-run treatment centres.

The Ministry of Social Justice and Empowerment funds treatment and rehabilitation services, mostly run by non-governmental organisations, under the National Action Plan for Drug Demand Reduction. These include Integrated Rehabilitation Centres for Addicts, which provide inpatient counselling and treatment. The ministry launched the Nasha Mukt Bharat Abhiyaan, a nationwide campaign covering prevention, treatment and rehabilitation, on 15 August 2020.

A national survey conducted by the National Drug Dependence Treatment Centre at the All India Institute of Medical Sciences and published in 2019 concluded that access to treatment for alcohol and drug dependence was inadequate, with only a small fraction of people with dependence receiving treatment.

=== Indonesia ===
In 2015 the National Narcotics Board (Indonesia) was pushing for compulsory drug treatment for people with drug dependence.

=== Iran ===
According to statistics best case scenario less than a 25% of addicts go back to being healthy. There are two types of rehab one is Revolutionary Guard Corp or FARAJA run article 16 quarantine which is part of operations cleaning the cities from addicts and homeless just as well, the others article 15 and article 17 run by others including State Welfare Organization of Iran and also those run by Ministry of health and medical education. There are also places called Trust houses since July 2023 run by IRGC.

=== Italy ===
In 1963, Pierino Gelmini founded Comunità Incontro, a drug rehabilitation center in Amelia, Italy.

=== United States ===
In the United States, records identifying patients as receiving substance use disorder treatment from federally assisted programs are subject to stricter confidentiality protections than general medical records, due to rules originally enacted in the 1970s to encourage individuals to seek treatment without fear of legal consequences. Such records cannot be used criminal, civil, or administrative proceedings against the patient.

== See also ==
- Coerced abstinence
- Florida shuffle
- Low-threshold treatment program
- Self-medication
- Sober companion
