= Comunità Incontro =

Italian drug rehab center

Comunità Incontro (English: Community Encounter) is an Italian drug rehabilitation facility founded by Pierino Gelmini, an Italian Catholic priest, on 13 February 1963. The facility, which is based in Amelia, Italy, received substantial backlash following Gelmini's 1971 arrest on charges of fraud, as well as further accusations of child sexual abuse. He died in 2014.

== Founding ==
Gelmini's experiences in Rome prompted his creation of the drug rehabilitation group in Amelia when Gelmini purchased an abandoned mill and refurbished it to serve as a community therapy house after a personal encounter with an 18-year-old victim of drug addiction lying in the middle of a street gutter. (In publications, the Comunità Incontro records the 13 February 1963 date of Gelmini's meeting with the young drug addict, Alfredo Nunzi, as the date of its founding, although its first center at the Amelia mill was only opened on 27 September 1979.)

== Expansion ==
Comunità Incontro successfully expanded into a veritable network of services dedicated to the addicted and their various social problems. At the beginning of the 1990s, Gelmini volunteered to be injected with an experimental AIDS vaccine in a study dedicated to finding an approach to dealing with HIV. Having established its first foreign center in 1987, the organization had grown to encompass more than two hundred chapters around the world by the late 2000s, including a number outside Italy and as far away as South America and Asia. Prime Minister Silvio Berlusconi presented a speech on the occasion of Gelmini's birthday in January 2005. (Berlusconi donated a gift of € 5 million to Comunità Incontro chapters in Thailand following the 2004 Indian Ocean earthquake and tsunami disaster.) The politician Maurizio Gasparri characterized him as "one of the few heroes of our time." Mass media reports worldwide have described Gelmini as politically well-connected.
