= Florida shuffle =

American medical practice

The Florida shuffle or shuffle describes the recruitment of a drug user with health insurance to repeatedly attend various rehab centers and sober living houses, which allows the facilities to bill the patient's insurance company repeatedly. The treatment centers that participate in this may have little regard for the actual needs of the patient. While named after Florida, the practice also occurs in other places in the United States, such as California and Arizona, with attractive climates and locations. A treatment center can earn more than $40,000 each time a patient goes through their program.

== Description ==
These users are sent to various rehab centers by brokers who work on a freelance basis for the centers. Brokers will use inducements like cash payments for time spent in rehab or free airfare in order to get drug users to a particular center. They will also sometimes supply the drug users with drugs so that the user will fail a urine test, allowing them to be admitted to the rehab center. Rehab centers will also use advertising on late-night television and social media in order to find potential patients. This process can continue until the user dies.

== History ==
The regulation of Florida rehab centers stemmed from four Florida rehab centers bills adopted by the Florida Legislature in 2017. These four Florida bills were the Practices of Substance Abuse Service Providers bill, Drug Overdoses bill, Controlled Substance Prescribing bill, and the Pub. Rec./Personal Identifying Information in Pleadings and Documents Filed with Court for Involuntary Assessment Under Part V, Chapter 397 bill. This practice started after the passage of the 2010 Affordable Care Act and the 1996 Mental Health Parity Act. The ACA required insurers to pay for drug rehabilitation treatment as an essential health benefit. Rehab centers are able to bill insurance companies substantial amounts of money for routine tests, such as $4,000 for a urinalysis test (sometimes facetiously referred to as "liquid gold") as of December 2017. According to insurance executives, it took several years to realize what was happening since urinalysis tests had never arisen as a billing issue before and the doctor-signed orders for the tests gave them an aura of medical authority. Many insurance companies are now cutting their reimbursement rates for drug tests.

Both federal and state legislation have been passed to attempt to curb the practice. This includes California, Florida, and the federal government through the Eliminating Kickbacks in Recovery Act (EKRA) in 2018. Florida has arrested 66 people under its law. These laws have resulted in the operators of some closed rehab centers relocating to different states without regulations or laws.
