= Low-threshold treatment program =

Type of drug rehabilitation program

Low-threshold treatment programs are harm reduction-based health care centers targeted towards people who use substances. "Low-threshold" programs are programs that make minimal demands on the patient, offering services without attempting to control their intake of drugs, and providing counselling only if requested. Low-threshold programs may be contrasted with "high-threshold" programs, which require the user to accept a certain level of control and which demand that the patient accept counselling and cease all drug use as a precondition of support.

Low-threshold treatment programs are distinct from simple needle exchange programs, and may include comprehensive healthcare and counseling services. The International Journal of Drug Policy in its volume 24 published an Editorial which endeavoured to define a service known to be "low-threshold", based on some popular and known criteria. According to that Editorial, low-threshold services for drug users can be defined as those which offer services to drug users; do not impose abstinence from drug use as a condition of service access; and endeavour to reduce other documented barriers to service access. Beyond comprehensive needle exchange services, other examples of low-threshold, community-based programs include those that support people who use alcohol or drugs to consider positive or health protective changes without a demand for "recovery," such as those piloted in New York City in the 1990s as "recovery readiness" efforts to bolster HIV prevention.

== Background ==
Injection drug users (IDUs) are at risk of a wide range of health problems arising from non-sterile injecting practices, complications of the drug itself or of the lifestyle associated with drug use and dependence. Furthermore, unrelated health problems, such as diabetes, may be neglected because of drug dependence. Sharing of health information with police, or requirements that patients abstain from all illegal drug use prior to receiving support are further impediments to health seeking, or require patients to lie about drug use in order to receive other lifesaving services. For all these reasons, despite their increased health care needs, IDUs do not have the required access to care or may be reluctant to use conventional services. Consequently, their health may deteriorate to a point at which emergency treatment is required, with considerable costs to both the IDUs and the health system. Accordingly, harm reduction based health care centers, also known as targeted health care outlet or low-threshold health care outlet for IDUs have been established across a range of settings utilising a variety of models. These targeted outlets provide integrated, low-threshold services within a harm-reduction framework targeting IDUs, and sometimes include social and/or other services. Where a particular service is not provided, referral and assistance with access is available. In 2007, for example, 33% of all US needle-syringe programs (NSPs) provided on-site medical care, and 7% provided buprenorphine treatment. Similarly, in many European countries NSP outlets serve as low-threshold primary health care centers targeting primarily IDUs.

== Health care models ==
These targeted outlets vary widely and may be either "distributive", providing basic harm reduction services and simple healthcare with facilitated referrals to specialist services, or "one-stop-shops" where a range of services including specialist services are provided onsite. The services being offered by these outlets range from simple needle and syringe provision, to expanded services including basic and preventive primary healthcare, hepatitis B and A vaccinations, hepatitis C testing, counselling, tuberculosis screening and sometimes opioid maintenance therapy. Some centers offer hepatitis, HIV treatment and dental care. The goal of these outlets is to provide: (1) opportunistic health care, (2) increased temporal and spatial availability of health care, (3) trustworthy services of health care, (4) cost-effective mode of health care, (5) targeted and tailored services.

In the United States as of 2011, 211 NSPs were known to be operating in 32 states, the District of Columbia, Puerto Rico and the Indian Nations. The bulk of funding has come from state and local governments, since for most of the last several decades, federal funding for needle exchange programs has been specifically banned.

Globally, as of 2008, at least 77 countries and territories offer NSPs with varying structures, aims, and goals. Some countries use needle exchange services as part of integrated programs to contain drug use, while others aim simply to contain HIV infection as their top priority, considering a reduction in the incidence of drug use as a much lower priority. Acceptance of NSPs vary widely from country to country. On the one hand, in Australia and New Zealand, electronic dispensing machines are available at selected locations such as the Auckland needle exchange and the Christchurch needle exchange, allowing needle exchange service 24 hours to registered users. On the other hand, over half of the countries in Asia, the Middle East, and North Africa retain the death penalty for drug offenses, although some have not carried out executions in recent years.

== Evaluation ==
The first federally-funded scientific study of a needle exchange program for intravenous drug injection in the United States began in November 1990 in Connecticut. An early analysis of its effectiveness as a strategy to reduce spread of HIV/AIDS in the New Haven population covered its first 20 months.

Samples of used syringes returned to the program in exchange for sterile ones were tested for HIV-1 proviral DNA using a polymerase chain reaction (PCR) method developed by Robert Heimer of Yale School of Medicine. The work of Heimer and colleagues attracted national attention for demonstrating a one-third reduction in viral transmission, and an inability to disprove the null hypothesis of no new infections during the study period.

Later studies similarly suggest that such outlets improve the overall health status of IDUs and save on the health budget by reducing episodes in emergency departments and tertiary hospitals. In Australia, monitoring of drug users participating in NSPs showed the incidence of HIV among NSP clients to be essentially identical to that of the general population. Fears that NSPs may draw drug activity into the communities in which they operate are contradicted by a study that showed that by far the greatest number of clients of an NSP in Chicago came to the area to exchange needles (60%) rather than to buy drugs (3.8%).

Internationally, support for the effectiveness of low-threshold programs including needle exchange have come from studies conducted in Afghanistan, China, Spain, Taiwan, Estonia, Canada, Iran, and many other countries. However, in many countries, there is strong opposition to such programs.

Comprehensive surveys of the costs and effectiveness of low-threshold primary healthcare programs have been challenging to publish due to the heterogeneity of these programs and the study designs. The APT Foundation's Open Access Model for scaling up methadone treatment is a notable exception.

Available evidence suggests the ongoing need for targeted and low-threshold services. Prevention of HIV and hepatitis C transmission is clearly possible for those unable or unwilling to stop injecting drug use. A range of countries using low-threshold approach have achieved control or virtual elimination of HIV transmission among people who inject drugs, even during challenging conditions such as armed conflict. For these reasons, organizations ranging from the U.S. National Institutes of Health, the Centers for Disease Control, the American Bar Association, the American Medical Association, the American Psychological Association, the World Health Organization, the European Monitoring Center for Drugs and Drug Addiction and many others have endorsed low-threshold programs.
