= Pierino Gelmini =

Italian priest (1925–2014)

Pietro "Pierino" Gelmini (20 January 1925 – 12 August 2014) was a prominent Italian former Roman Catholic priest who founded the drug abuse rehabilitation center Comunità Incontro (Community Encounter).

Despite his 1971 imprisonment on charges of fraud, Gelmini has been highly regarded for his work with the drug-addicted, having received praise from such figures as media tycoon and prime minister Silvio Berlusconi, who gave € 5 million (six million dollars) to Comunità Incontro in 2005, and the Italian Senator Maurizio Gasparri, who once celebrated him as "one of the few heroes of our time."

Personally accused of sexual abuse by a total of twelve young men who claim to have been victimized while recovering at Gelmini's Amelia rehabilitation center, Gelmini was indicted in June 2010, but the trial was deferred several times due to his wealth conditions and with his death in 2014 any crime would be extinct. Gelmini had been laicized from the priesthood at his own request.

== Biography ==
Pierino Gelmini was born Pietro Gelmini in 1925 in Pozzuolo Martesana, a small community in the Province of Milan, and grew up and studied in his native Lombardy. (His official biography records him as a member of the Italian Resistance during the Second World War.) He was ordained in the priesthood of the Roman Catholic Church in 1949. Gelmini's younger brother, Angelo Gelmini (born 1931), was ordained in 1952 and is well known as Padre Eligio. Gelmini transferred to work in Rome in the 1950s, where he became the personal secretary of the Argentine cardinal Luic Copello and established himself at the Infernetto, a suburb under Rome Municipio X.

Gelmini's experiences in Rome prompted his creation of the drug rehabilitation group Comunità Incontro (Community Encounter) in Amelia, Italy, where Gelmini purchased an abandoned mill and refurbished it to serve as a community therapy house after a personal encounter with an 18-year-old victim of a drug addiction lying in the middle of a street gutter. (In publications, the Comunità Incontro records the 13 February 1963 date of Gelmini's meeting with the young drug addict, Alfredo Nunzi, as the date of its founding, although its first center at the Amelia mill was only opened on 27 September 1979.)

Italian investigative press reports during the 2000s uncovered that in the 1960s and 1970s Gelmini was investigated for the white-collar charges of bankruptcy fraud and writing bad checks by prosecutors. (He was arrested a total of three times between 1960 and 1976.) The troubled Gelmini left Italy but ran into similar trouble in South Vietnam, where allegations of foul play involved embezzling from the influential Huế Archbishop Ngô Đình Thục and the widow of Ngô Đình Nhu, the political advisor of the overwhelmingly Buddhist country's Roman Catholic first president Ngo Dinh Diem. In Italy, he received a four-year prison sentence for fraud upon his return in 1971. Although briefly suspended from his priestly work (cessatio a divinis) during this time, he was forgiven by the Catholic Church and continued working within its hierarchy. Such less-than-pleasant facts were not widely publicized in the press at the time and were systematically omitted from all of Gelmini's official biographies. Gelmini's last run-in with the law before the filing of sexual abuse charges in the 2000s occurred in 1976, when he was investigated for corruption but acquitted in court in 1977.

Despite such personal troubles, Comunità Incontro successfully expanded into a veritable network of services dedicated to the addicted and their various social problems. At the beginning of the 1990s, Gelmini volunteered to be injected with an experimental AIDS vaccine in a study dedicated to finding an approach to dealing with HIV.

A highly visible social figure towards the end of the 1980s, Gelmini produced written works in the 1990s which described both Centro Incontro's therapeutic approach and his own experiences. Some writing was translated into Slovenian and French; a 1993 English translation, A Plan for Life Community Encounter: Origins, History, Growth, was printed in the United Kingdom by St. Paul's Press. In Italy, Gelmini's work became a subject of various domestic writers.

Having established its first foreign centre in 1987, the Comunità Incontro organization had grown to encompass more than two hundred chapters around the world by the late 2000s, including a number outside Italy and as far away as South America and Asia. Prime Minister Silvio Berlusconi presented a speech on the occasion of Gelmini's birthday in January 2005. (Berlusconi donated a gift of € 5 million to Comunità Incontro chapters in Thailand following the 2004 Indian Ocean earthquake and tsunami disaster.) The politician Maurizio Gasparri characterized him as "one of the few heroes of our time." Mass media reports worldwide have described Gelmini as politically well-connected.

Two years before, Gelmine had been reduced to the lay state after the charges of minor sexual abuse.

== Controversy ==
=== Abuse accusations and anti-Jewish sentiments ===
In 2007, nine young men levelled accusations that Gelmini had sexually abused them at the Comunità Incontro chapter in Amelia; three more followed amid the spate of charges of abuse during the worldwide Roman Catholic Church sexual abuse scandal of the 2000s. One of the men alleged that he and the elderly Gelmini had engaged in fingering and forced kissing during their sexual encounter. Prosecutor Carlo Maria Scipio and deputy prosecutor Barbara Mazzulo ordered the launch of an investigation. In 2008, Gelmini was laicized at his own request to Pope Benedict XVI.

A New York Times report on tensions in Jewish-Catholic relations described the Catholic Church as a target of additional criticism when Gelmini placed blame for the sexual abuse accusations on unspecified "Jewish radical-chic" groups. The South African news and information website Independent Online provided a translation of remarks Gelmini had made to the Corriere della Sera. Gelmini was quoted as saying

Think about what happened in America, the instrumentalisation of American paedophile priests. The church made an error in paying compensation. If I make a mistake, the entire Catholic Church should not have to pay for me. . .

But this seems as if it was a strategic act made by this global lobby - how shall I put it - the fashionable radical Jewish lobby, which emanates from America. . . and tries to weaken the whole church.

Gelmini reversed himself after the issue of anti-Jewish hostility was raised and extended an apology to the Jews for his remarks. Still persisting in assigning blame by accusing the Freemasons, he was quoted by the Italian press as saying "I apologize to the Jews: I have very much respect and consideration for them, but I think there is a Masonic lodge radical chic fighting the Church on all fronts. . ."

As prosecutors moved forward with an indictment in June 2010, Gelmini dismissed the accusations as a "denigrating campaign of lies" and described the allegations as unfounded and impossible because of his advanced age at the time of the alleged abuse episodes. Defence lawyer Lanfranco Frezza offered the explanation that some of the accusers bore a grudge against Gelmini because they had been kicked out of the centre for theft and other improper behaviour and asserted that "no proof" would be forthcoming to support their claims.

Gelmini's trial was due to start in 2011, but was deferred several times, also due to his declining wealth conditions, and with his death in 2014, it cannot be held anymore, as any crime would become extinct.

=== Anti-Islamic sentiments ===
Politically close to the centre-right, in March 2000 Gelmini participated in the presentation of the "manifesto" of the Alleanza Nazionale (National Alliance) values and ideas without compromise as the face of the fight against drugs, but embarrassed Alliance leader Gianfranco Fini when he declared that "... the Muslims in Italy will soon be 10-15% of the population and they will put at risk the purity of our values. A time has come for them to plunder our cities; today they have a buzzword: marry Catholic women to convert them to Islam. It is necessary to stop this vermin.".

== Works ==
In English translation:

- A Plan for Life Community Encounter: Origins, History, Growth Slough, UK: St. Paul's, 1993.

In Italian:

- Proposta di vita: la Comunità Incontro : genesi, storia, sviluppo. Milan: Edizioni Paoline, 1992.
- Don Gelmini incontra la musica italiana a Rock café. Milan: Edizioni Paoline, 1993.
- Fiori di mare. Pensieri. Turin: San Paolo Edizioni, 1999.
- with Alessandro Meluzzi: Cristoterapia. Dialogo di vita fonte di speranza. Roma Morena: Edizioni OCD, 2007.

== Distinctions ==
- Italy: Grand Officer of the Order of Merit of the Italian Republic
- Knight Grand Cross of the Patriarchal Order of the Holy Cross of Jerusalem
