= Needle and syringe programmes =

Method of providing drug users with uninfected equipment

Needle exchange programme
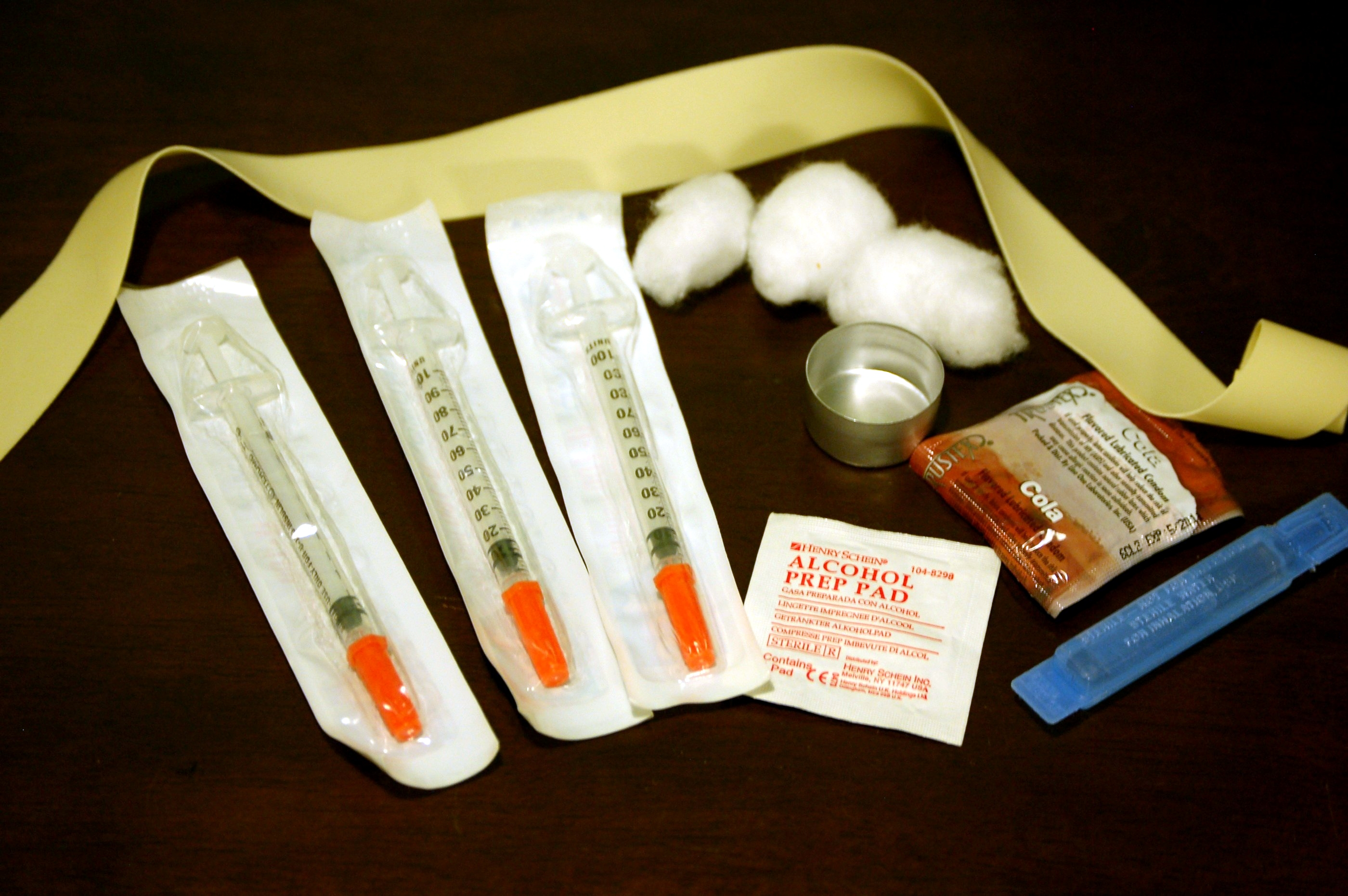
- Contents of a needle-exchange kit
- Other names: Syringe-exchange programme (SEP), needle exchange program (NEP)

A needle and syringe programme (NSP), also known as needle exchange program (NEP), is a social service that allows injection drug users (IDUs) to obtain clean and unused hypodermic needles and associated paraphernalia at little or no cost. It is based on the philosophy of harm reduction that attempts to reduce the risk factors for blood-borne diseases such as HIV/AIDS and hepatitis.

== History ==
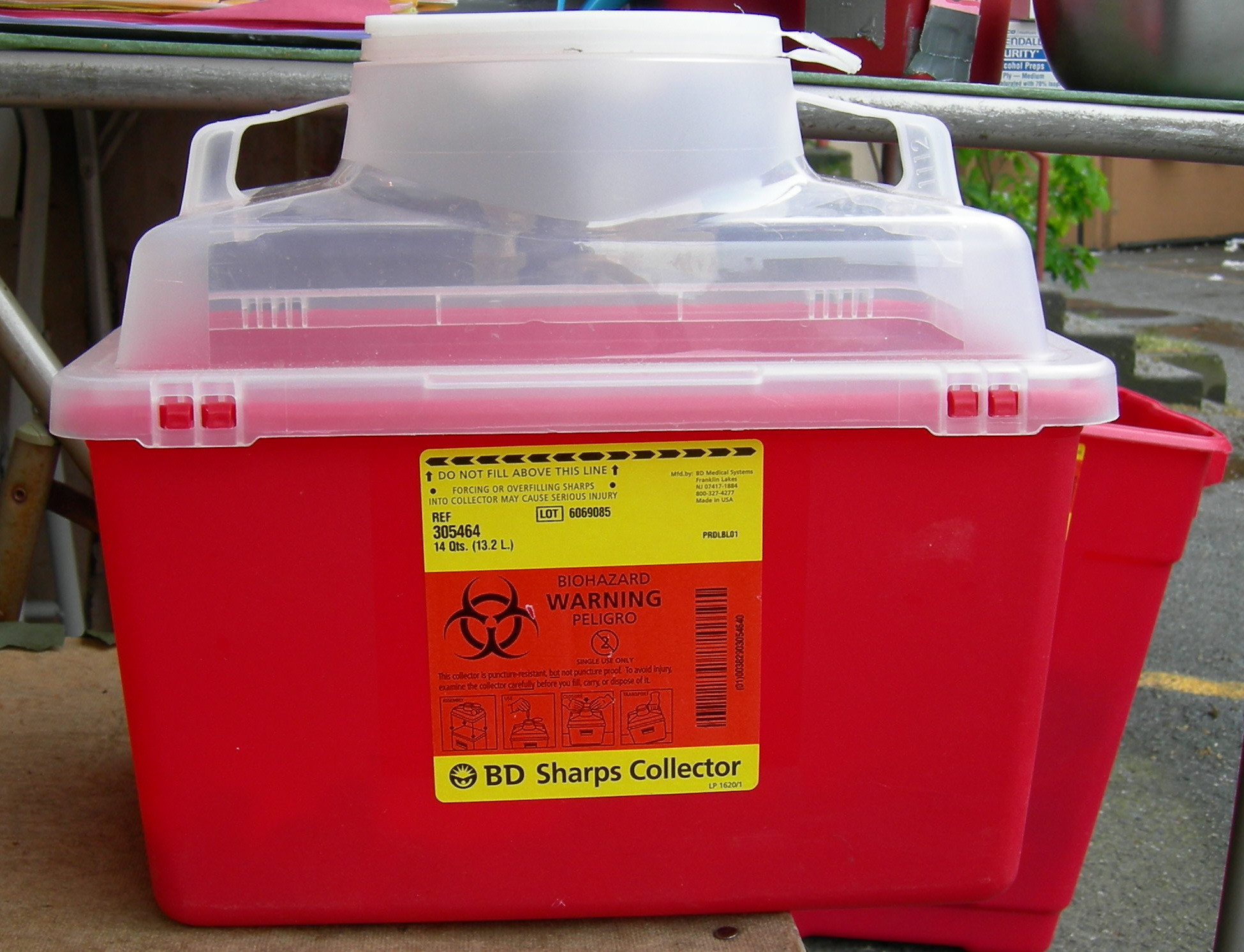
"Sharps" container (for safe disposal of hypodermic needles)

Needle-exchange programmes can be traced back to informal activities undertaken during the 1970s. The idea is likely to have been rediscovered in multiple locations. The first government-approved initiative (Netherlands) was undertaken in the early to mid-1980s, followed closely by initiatives in the United Kingdom and Australia by 1986. While the initial programme was motivated by an outbreak of hepatitis B, the AIDS pandemic motivated the rapid adoption of these programmes around the world.

== Operation ==
Needle and syringe programs operate differently in different parts of the world; the first NSPs in Europe and Australia gave out sterile equipment to drug users, having begun in the context of the early AIDS epidemic. The United States took a far more reluctant approach, typically requiring IDUs to already have used needles to exchange for sterile ones - this "one-for-one" system is where the same number of syringes must be returned.

According to Santa Cruz County, California, exchange staff interviewed by Santa Cruz Local in 2019, it is a common practice not to count the number of exchanged needles exactly, but rather to estimate the number based on a container's volume. Holyoke, Massachusetts, also uses the volume system. United Nations Office on Drugs and Crime for South Asia suggests visual estimation or asking the client how many they brought back. The volume-based method left potential for gaming the system and an exchange agency in Vancouver devoted significant effort to game the system.

Some, such as the Columbus Public Health in Ohio weigh the returned sharps rather than counting.

The practices and policies vary between needle and syringe program sites. In addition to exchange, there is a model called "needs-based" where the syringes are handed out without requiring any to be returned.

According to a report published in 1994, Montreal's CACTUS exchange which has a policy of one-for-one, plus one needle with a limit of 15 had a return rate of 75-80% between 1991 and 1993.

An exchange in Boulder, Colorado, implemented a one-for-one with four starter needles and reported an exchange rate of 89.1% in 1992.

In the United States, where the one-for-one system still dominates, some 25% of injecting drug users are living positive with HIV; in Australia, which hands out equipment for free to anyone needing it (only charging a small fee for some more expensive equipment, like wheel filters and higher-quality tourniquets), only 1% of the IDU population is HIV-positive as of 2015, compared to over 20% in the late 1980s when NSP programs began to spread nationally and became accessible to most of the population.

== International experience ==
Programs providing sterile needles and syringes currently operate in 87 countries around the world. IA comprehensive 2004 study by the World Health Organization (WHO) found a "compelling case that NSPs substantially and cost effectively reduce the spread of HIV among IDUs and do so without evidence of exacerbating injecting drug use at either the individual or societal level." WHO's findings have also been supported by the American Medical Association (AMA), which in 2000 adopted a position strongly supporting NSPs when combined with addiction counseling.

=== Australia ===
The Melbourne, Australia, inner-city suburbs of Richmond, and Abbotsford are locations in which the use and dealing of heroin has been concentrated. The Burnet Institute research organisation completed the 2013 "North Richmond Public Injecting Impact Study" in collaboration with the Yarra Drug and Health Forum and North Richmond Community Health Centre and recommended 24-hour access to sterile injecting equipment due to the ongoing "widespread, frequent and highly visible" nature of illicit drug use in the areas. Between 2010 and 2012 a four-fold increase in the levels of inappropriately discarded injecting equipment was documented for the two suburbs. In the surrounding City of Yarra, an average of 1,550 syringes per month was collected from public syringe disposal bins in 2012. Paul Dietze stated, "We have tried different measures and the problem persists, so it's time to change our approach".

On 28 May 2013, the Burnet Institute stated that it recommended 24-hour access to sterile injecting equipment in the Melbourne suburb of Footscray after the area's drug culture continued to grow after more than ten years of intense law enforcement efforts. The institute's research concluded that public injecting behaviour is frequent in the area and injecting paraphernalia has been found in carparks, parks, footpaths, and drives. Furthermore, people who inject drugs have broken into syringe disposal bins to reuse discarded equipment.

A study commissioned by the Australian Government revealed that for every A$1 invested in NSPs in Australia, $4 was saved in direct healthcare costs, and if productivity and economic benefits are included, the programs returned a staggering $27 for every $1 invested. The study notes that over a longer time horizon than that considered (10 years) the cost-benefit ratio grows even further. In terms of infections averted and lives saved, the study finds that, between 2000 and 2009, 32,000 HIV infections and 96,667 hepatitis C infections were averted, and approximately 140,000 disability-adjusted life years were gained.

=== United Kingdom ===
From the 1980s, Maggie Telfer from the Bristol Drugs Project advocated for needle exchanges to be established in the United Kingdom. The British public body, the National Institute for Health and Care Excellence (NICE), introduced a recommendation in April 2014 due to an increase in the number of young people who inject steroids at UK needle exchanges. NICE previously published needle exchange guidelines in 2009, in which needle and syringe services were not advised for people under 18, but the organisation's director Professor Mike Kelly explained that a "completely different group" of people were presenting at programmes. In the updated guidance, NICE recommended the provision of specialist services for "rapidly increasing numbers of steroid users", and that needles should be provided to people under the age of 18—a first for NICE—following reports of 15-year-old steroid injectors seeking to develop their muscles.

=== United States ===
Campaigning in the United States

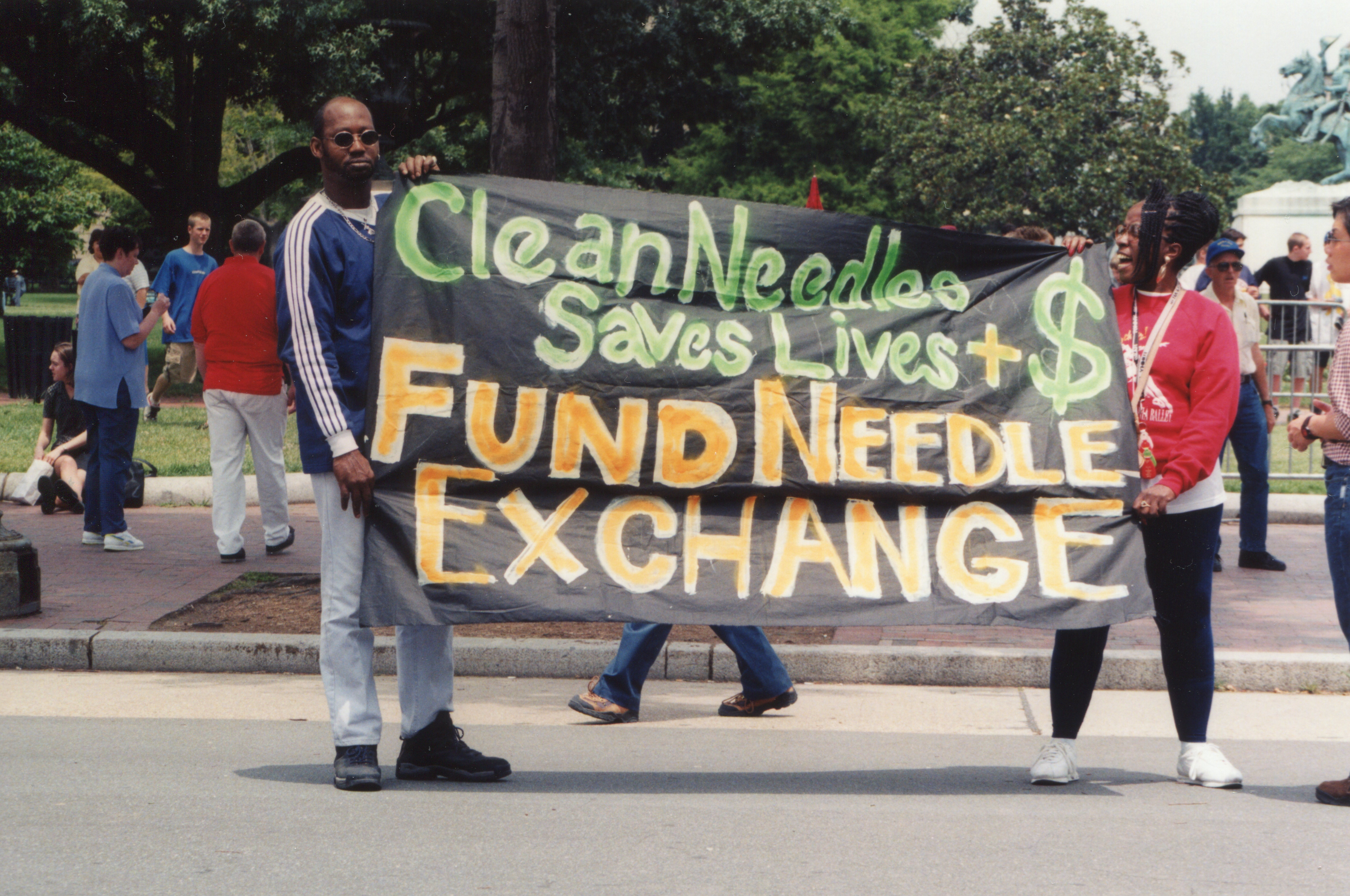
Two people campaigning in Washington D.C. in 1998 with a banner supporting clean needles and funding for needle exchanges

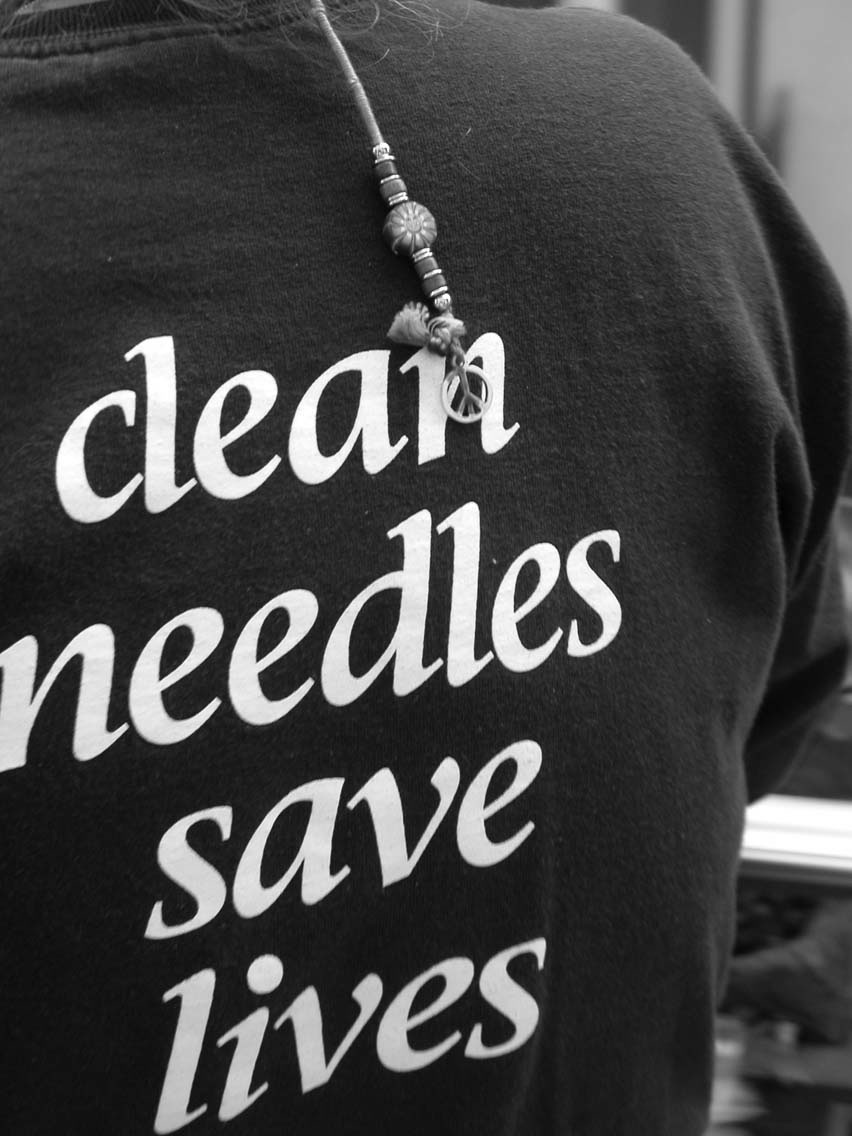
Person in New Orleans, October 2008 with a t-shirt stating "clean needles save lives"

The first program in the United States to be operated at public expenses was established in Tacoma, Washington in November 1988. The Centers for Disease Control and Prevention and the National Institutes of Health confirm that needle exchange is an effective strategy for the prevention of HIV. The NIH estimated in 2002 that in the United States, 15–20% of injection drug users have HIV and at least 70% have hepatitis C. The Centers for Disease Control (CDC) reports one-fifth of all new HIV infections and the vast majority of hepatitis C infections are the result of injection drug use. United States Department of Health and Human Services reports 7%, or 2,400 cases of HIV infections in 2018 were among drug users.

Portland, Oregon, was the first city in nation to expend public funds on a NSP which opened in 1989. It is also one of the longest running programme in the country. Despite the word "exchange" in the programme name, the Portland needle exchange operated by Multnomah County hands out syringes to addicts who do not present any to exchange. The exchange programme reports 70% of their users are transients who experience "homelessness or unstable housing" It was reported that during the fiscal year 2015–2016, the county dispensed 2,478,362 syringes and received 2,394,460, a shortage of 83,902 needles. In 2016, it was reported that the Cleveland needle exchange program sees "mostly white suburban kids ages 18 to 25".

==== San Francisco ====
Since the full sanction of syringe exchange programs (SEP) by then-Mayor Frank Jordan in 1993, the San Francisco Department of Public Health has been responsible for the management of syringe access and the proposed disposal of these devices in the city. This sanction, which was originally executed as a state of emergency to address the HIV epidemic, allowed SEPs to provide sterile syringes, take back used devices, and operate as a service for health education to support individuals struggling with substance use disorders. Since then, it was approximated that from July 1, 2017, to December 31, 2017, only 1,672,000 out of the 3,030,000 distributed needles (60%) were returned to the designated sites. In April 2018, acting Mayor Mark Farrell allocated $750,000 towards the removal of abandoned needles littering the streets of San Francisco.

==== General characteristics ====
As of 2011, at least 221 programmes operated in the US. Most (91%) were legally authorized to operate; 38.2% were managed by their local health authorities. The CDC reported in 1993 that the most significant expenses for the NSPs is personnel cost, which reports it represents 66% of the budget.

More than 36 million syringes were distributed annually, mostly through large urban programmes operating a stationary site. More generally, US NEPs distribute syringes through a variety of methods including mobile vans, delivery services and backpack/pedestrian routes that include secondary (peer-to-peer) exchange.

==== Funding ====
In the United States, a ban on federal funding for needle exchange programs began in 1988, when republican North Carolina Senator Jesse Helms led Congress to enact a prohibition on the use of federal funds to encourage drug abuse. The ban was briefly lifted in 2009, reinstated in 2010, and partially lifted again in 2015. Currently, federal funds can still not be used for the purchase of needles and syringes or other injecting paraphernalia by needle exchange programs, though can be used for training and other program support in the case of a declared public health emergency. In the time between 2010 and 2011 when no ban was in place, at least three programmes were able to obtain federal funds and two-thirds reported planning to pursue such funding. A 1997 study estimated that while the funding ban was in effect, it "may have led to HIV infection among thousands of IDUs, their sexual partners, and their children." US NEPs continue to be funded through a mixture of state and local government funds, supplemented by private donations. The funding ban was effectively lifted for every aspect of the exchanges except the needles themselves in the omnibus spending bill passed in December 2015 and signed by President Obama. This change was first suggested by Kentucky Republicans Hal Rogers and Mitch McConnell, according to their spokespeople.

==== Legal aspects ====
Many states criminalized needle possession without a prescription, arresting people as they left underground needle exchange efforts. In some jurisdictions, such as New York, needle exchange activists challenged the laws in court, with judges ruling that their actions were justified by a "necessity defense" which permits breaking of a law to prevent an imminent harm. In other jurisdictions where syringe possession without a prescription remained illegal, physician-based prescription programmes have shown promise. Epidemiological research demonstrating that syringe access programmes are both effective and cost-effective helped to change state and local NEP-operation laws, as well as the status of syringe possession more broadly. For example, between 1989 and 1992, three exchanges in New York City tagged syringes to help demonstrate rates of return prior to the legalization of the approach.

By 2012, legal syringe exchange programmes existed in at least 35 states. In some settings, syringe possession and purchase is decriminalized, while in others, authorized NEP clients are exempt from certain drug paraphernalia laws. However, despite the legal changes, gaps between the formal law and environment mean that many programmes continue to face law enforcement interference and covert programmes continue to exist within the U.S.

Colorado allows covert syringe exchange programmes to operate. Current Colorado laws leave room for interpretation over the requirement of a prescription to purchase syringes. Based on such laws, the majority of pharmacies do not sell syringes without a prescription and police arrest people who possess syringes without a prescription. Boulder County health department reports between January 2012 and March 2012, the group received over 45,000 dirty needles and distributed around 45,200 sterile syringes.

As of 2017, NSPs are illegal in 15 states. NSPs are prohibited by local regulations in cities in Orange County, California, even though it is not disallowed by state law in California.

== Law enforcement ==
=== Conflict with law enforcement ===
Removal of legal barriers to the operation of NEPs and other syringe access initiatives has been identified as an important part of a comprehensive approach to reducing HIV transmission among IDUs. Legal barriers include both "law on the books" and "law on the streets", i.e., the actual practices of law enforcement officers, which may or may not reflect relevant law. Changes in syringe and drug control policy can be ineffective in reducing such barriers if police continue to treat syringe possession as a crime or participation in NEP as evidence of criminal activity.

Although most US NEPs operate legally, many report some form of police interference. In a 2009 national survey of 111 US NEP managers, 43% reported at least monthly client harassment, 31% at least monthly unauthorized confiscation of clients' syringes, 12% at least monthly client arrest en route to or from NEP and 26% uninvited police appearances at program sites at least every six months. In multivariate modeling, legal status of the program (operating legally vs illegally) and jurisdiction's syringe regulation environment were not associated with frequency of police interference.

A detailed 2011 analysis of NEP client experiences in Los Angeles suggested that as many as 7% of clients report negative encounters with security officers in any given month. Given that syringes are not prohibited in the jurisdiction and their confiscation can only occur as part of an otherwise authorized arrest, almost 40% of those who reported syringe confiscation were not arrested. This raises concerns about extrajudicial confiscation of personal property. Approximately 25% of the encounters detailed by respondents involved private security personnel, rather than local police.

Similar findings have emerged internationally. For example, despite instituting laws protecting syringe access and possession and adopting NEPs, IDUs and sex workers in Mexico's Northern Border regions report frequent syringe confiscation by law enforcement personnel. In this region as well as elsewhere, reports of syringe confiscation are correlated with increases in risky behaviors, such as groin injecting, public injection and utilization of pharmacies. These practices translate to risk for HIV and other blood-borne diseases.

=== Racial gradient ===
NEPs serving predominantly IDUs of color may be almost four times more likely to report frequent client arrest en route to or from the program and almost four times more likely to report unauthorized syringe confiscation. A 2005 study in Philadelphia found that African-Americans accessing the city's legally operated exchange decreased at more than twice the rate of white individuals after the initiation of a police anti-drug operation. These and other findings illustrate a possible mechanism by which racial disparities in law enforcement can translate into disparities in HIV transmission. The majority (56%) of respondents reported not documenting adverse police events; those who did were 2.92 times more likely to report unauthorized syringe confiscation. These findings suggest that systematic surveillance and interventions are needed to address police interference.

=== Causes ===
Police interference with legal NEP operations may be partially explained by training defects. A study of police officers in an urban police department four years after the decriminalization of syringe purchase and possession in the US state of Rhode Island suggested that up to a third of police officers were not aware that the law had changed. This knowledge gap parallels other areas of public health law, underscoring pervasive gaps in dissemination.

Even police officers with accurate knowledge of the law, however, reported intention to confiscate syringes from drug users as a way to address problematic substance use. Police also reported anxiety about accidental needle sticks and acquiring communicable diseases from IDUs, but were not trained or equipped to deal with this occupational risk; this anxiety was intertwined with negative attitudes towards syringe access initiatives.

=== Training and interventions to address law enforcement barriers ===
US NEPs have successfully trained police, especially when framed as addressing police occupational safety and human resources concerns. Preliminary evidence also suggests that training can shift police knowledge and attitudes regarding NEPs specifically and public health-based approaches towards problematic drug use in general.

According to a 2011 survey, 20% of US NEPs reported training police during the previous year. Covered topics included the public health rationale behind NEPs (71%), police occupational health (67%), needle stick injury (62%), NEPs' legal status (57%), and harm reduction philosophy (67%). On average, training was seen as moderately effective, but only four programmes reported conducting any formal evaluation. Assistance with training police was identified by 72% of respondents as the key to improving police relations.

== Advocacy ==
Organizations ranging from the NIH, CDC, the American Bar Association, the American Medical Association, the American Psychological Association, the World Health Organization and many others endorsed low-threshold programmes including needle exchange.

Needle exchange programmes have faced opposition on both political and moral grounds. Advocacy groups including the National District Attorneys Association (NDAA), Drug Watch International, The Heritage Foundation, Drug Free Australia, and religious organizations such as the Catholic Church have opposed them.

In the United States NEP programmes have proliferated, despite lack of public acceptance. Internationally, needle exchange is widely accepted.

== Research ==
=== Disease transmission ===
Two 2010 "reviews of reviews" by a team originally led by Norah Palmateer that examined systematic reviews and meta-analyses on the topic found insufficient evidence that NSP prevents transmission of the hepatitis C virus, tentative evidence that it prevents transmission of HIV, and sufficient evidence that it reduces self-reported risky injecting behaviour. In a comment Palmateer warned politicians not to use her team's review of reviews as a justification to close existing programmes or to hinder the introduction of new needle-exchange schemes. The weak evidence on the programmes' disease prevention effectiveness is due to inherent design limitations of the reviewed primary studies and should not be interpreted as the programmes lacking preventive effects.

The second of the Palmateer team's "review of reviews" scrutinised 10 previous formal reviews of needle exchange studies, and after critical appraisal only four reviews were considered rigorous enough to meet the inclusion criteria. Those were done by the teams of Gibson (2001), Wodak and Cooney (2004), Tilson (2007) and Käll (2007). The Palmateer team judged that their conclusion in favour of NSP effectiveness was not consistent with the results from the HIV studies they reviewed.

The Wodak and Cooney review had, from 11 studies of what they determined as demonstrating acceptable rigour, found 6 that were positive regarding the effectiveness of NSPs in preventing HIV, 3 that were negative and 2 inconclusive. However a review by Käll et al. disagreed with the Wodak and Cooney review, reclassifying the studies on NSP effectiveness to 3 positive, 3 negative and 5 inconclusive. The US Institute of Medicine evaluated the conflicting evidence of both Drs Wodak and Käll in their Geneva session and concluded that although multicomponent HIV prevention programmes that include needle and syringe exchange reduced intermediate HIV risk behavior, evidence regarding the effect of needle and syringe exchange alone on HIV incidence was limited and inconclusive, given "myriad design and methodological issues noted in the majority of studies." Four studies that associated needle exchange with reduced HIV prevalence failed to establish a causal link, because they were designed as population studies rather than assessing individuals.

NEPs successfully serve as one component of HIV prevention strategies. Multi-component HIV prevention programmes that include NSE reduce drug-related HIV risk behaviors and enhance the impact of harm reduction services.

Tilson (2007) concluded that only comprehensive packages of services in multi-component prevention programmes can be effective in reducing drug-related HIV risks. In such packages, it is unclear what the relative contribution of needle exchange may be to reductions in risk behavior and HIV incidence.

Multiple examples can be cited showing the relative ineffectiveness of needle exchange programmes alone in stopping the spread of blood-borne disease. Many needle exchange programmes do not make any serious effort to treat drug addiction. For example, David Noffs of the Life Education Center wrote, "I have visited sites around Chicago where people who request info on quitting their habit are given a single sheet on how to go cold turkey—hardly effective treatment or counseling."

A 2013 systematic review found support for the use of NEPs to prevent and treat HIV and HCV infection. A 2014 systematic review and meta-analysis found evidence that NEPs were effective in reducing HIV transmission among injection drug users, but that other harm reduction programmes have probably also contributed to the decrease in HIV incidence. NEPs appear to be as effective in low- and middle-income countries as in high-income ones.

=== Worker training ===
Lemon and Shah presented a 2013 paper at the International Congress of Psychiatrists that highlighted lack of training for needle exchange workers and also showed the workers performing a range of tasks beyond contractual obligations, for which they had little support or training. It also showed how needle exchange workers were a common first contact for distressed drug users. Perhaps the most concerning finding was that workers were not legally allowed to provide Naloxone should it be needed.

=== Drug use ===
According to a 2022 study by Vanderbilt University economist Analisa Packham, syringe exchange programs reduce HIV rates by 18.2 percent but lead to greater drug use. Syringe exchange programmes increased drug-related mortality rates by 11.7 percent and opioid-related mortality rates by 21.6 percent.

== Arguments for and against ==
=== Needle disposal ===
==== NSPs do not increase litter: broad arguments ====
Activist groups claim there is no way to ensure SEP users will be properly disposed of. Peer-reviewed studies suggest that there are less improperly disposed of syringes in cities with needle exchange programs than in cities without. Other studies of similar design find that syringe exchange program drop boxes were associated with an overall decrease of improper syringe disposal (over 98% decrease) and going further from said syringe exchange sites increases the amount of improperly disposed needles. Other ethnographic studies find evidence that criminal related drug possession laws further serve to increase improperly disposed of needles, and decreasing the severity of possession laws may positively impact proper syringe disposal, this corroborates the CDC's own guidelines on syringe disposal, which claim "Studies have found that syringe litter is more likely in areas without SSPs".

==== NSPs do increase litter: broad arguments ====
On the other hand, there is data to suggest SEPs do increase improper syringe disposal. Opposition groups contribute their own proof through photographic evidence of increased needle litter, additionally, opponents argue that programs which do not mandate a 1:1 needle exchange encourage the more convenient improper discarding of needles when the programs are not open or are not accepting needle returns. Additionally, many programs allow for unlimited access to needles, which opponents argue increases litter to a much higher degree on the basis of increasing total needles in circulation. Portland residents in areas where syringe acquisition is unlimited claim to be "drowning in needles" and picking up upwards of 100 per week. Opposition groups also argue government action in increasing the amount of syringe disposal boxes is slow.

- NSPs that strictly adhere to one-for-one policy and do not furnish starter syringes/needles do not increase the number of them in circulation.
- The few studies that specifically evaluated the effects of NEPs produced "modest" evidence of no impact on improper needle discards and injection frequency and "weak" evidence on lack of impact on numbers of drug users, high-risk user networks and crime trends.
- Some NSPs hands outs needles without an expectation of used syringes being returned. One NSP in Portland, Oregon, hands out syringes without question. Neighbors near the NSP are routinely finding discarded syringes and the neighborhood organization to which they are a part of, the University Park park neighborhood association, desires the needle handout operation to stop. A local resident visited a NSP in Chico, California, and she was handed 100 syringes without question. The City Council in Chico is discussing banning the operation.
- A 2003 Australian bi-partisan Federal Parliamentary inquiry published recommendations, registering concern about the lack of accountability of Australia's needle exchanges, and lack of a national program to track needle stick injuries. Community concern about discarded needles and needle stick injury led Australia to allocate $17.5 million in 2003/4 to investigating retractable technology for syringes.

=== Treatment program enrollment ===
- IDUs risk multiple health problems from non-sterile injecting practices, drug complications and associated lifestyle choices. Unrelated health problems such as diabetes may be neglected because of drug dependence. IDUs are typically reluctant to use conventional health services. Such reluctance/neglect implies poorer health and increased use of emergency services, creating added costs. Harm reduction based health care centres, also known as targeted health care outlet or low-threshold health care outlet for IDUs have been established to address this issue.
- NSP staff facilitate connections among people who use drugs and medical facilities, thereby exposing them to voluntary physical, psychological and emotional treatment programmes.
- Social services for addicts can be organized around needle exchanges, increasing their accessibility.

=== Cost effectiveness ===
As of 2011, CDC estimated that every HIV infection prevented through a needle exchange program saves an estimated US$178,000+. Separately it reported an overall 30 percent or more reduction in HIV cases among IDUs.

=== Proponents ===
Proponents of harm reduction argue that the provision of a needle exchange provides a social benefit in reducing health costs and also provides a safe means to dispose of used syringes. For example, in the United Kingdom, proponents of SEPs assert that, along with other programmes, they have reduced the spread of HIV among intravenous drug users. These supposed benefits have led to an expansion of these programmes in most jurisdictions that have introduced them, increasing geographical coverage and operating hours. Vending machines that automatically dispense injecting equipment have been successfully introduced.

Other promoted benefits of these programmes include providing a first point of contact for formal drug treatment, access to health and counselling service referrals, the provision of up-to-date information about safe injecting practices, access to contraception and sexual health services and providing a means for data collection from users about their behaviour and/or drug use patterns. SEP outlets in some settings offer basic primary health care. These are known as 'targeted primary health care outlets', because they primarily target people who inject drugs and/or 'low-threshold health care outlets', because they reduce common barriers to health care from the conventional health care outlets,. Clients frequently visit SEP outlets for help accessing sterile injecting equipment. These visits are used opportunistically to offer other health care services.

A clinical trial of needle exchange found that needle exchange did not cause an increase in drug injection.

=== California Environmental Quality Act (CEQA) ===
Within California, those opposed to syringe exchange programs have frequently invoked the California Environmental Quality Act (CEQA) as a means to bar syringe exchange programs from operating, citing the environmental impact of improper syringe disposals. Most notably SEP opposition within Santa Cruz, and Orange County—whose only syringe exchange program The Orange County Needle Exchange Program (OCNEP) was blocked from operating in October, 2019 by an Orange County lawsuit which charged the program with creating hazardous conditions and litter for residents. The OCNEP contests that public needle litter still exists after the shutdown of their program.

Legislation in California signed by governor Gavin Newsom in 2021, AB-1344, aimed to block the use of CEQA to challenge SEPs. The provision states that "Needle and syringe exchange services application submissions, authorizations, and operations performed pursuant to this chapter shall be exempt from review under the California Environmental Quality Act, Division 13 (commencing with Section 21000) of the Public Resources Code."

The provision was passed on the basis of curtailing the opioid epidemic. There is no part of the bill which explicitly addresses the environmental concerns of the plaintiffs.

=== Scope ===
In a 1993 mortality study among 415 injection drug users in the Philadelphia area, over four years, 28 died: 5 from HIV-related causes; 7 from overdose, 5 from homicide, 4 from heart disease, 3 from renal failure, 2 from liver disease, 1 from suicide and 1 from cancer.

=== Community issues ===
- NSP effectiveness studies usually focused on addict health effects; the United States National District Attorneys Association argues that they neglect effects on the broader community.
- NSPs may concentrate drug activity into communities in which they operate. Only a small number of short-term studies considered whether NSPs have such effects. To the extent that this happens, they may negatively affect property values, increase localized crime rates and damage broader perceptions about the host community. In 1987 in the Platzspitz park in Zürich "...authorities chose to allow illegal drug use and sales at the park, in an effort to contain Zürich's growing drug problem. Police were not allowed to enter the park or make arrests. Clean needles were given out to addicts as part of the Zürich Intervention Pilot Project, or ZIPP-AIDS program. However, lack of control over what went on in the park caused a multitude of problems. Drug dealers and users arrived from all over Europe, and crime became rampant as dealers fought for control and addicts (who numbered up to 20,000) stole to support their habit."
- In Australia, which is considered a leading proponent of harm reduction, a survey showed that one-third of the public believed that NSPs encouraged drug use, and 20% believed that NSPs dispensed drugs.

=== Diversion ===
NPR interviewed a syringe exchange program Prevention Point Philadelphia in Philadelphia, United States, and some of its clients. The program Prevention Point allows anyone presenting syringes to exchange for the same quantity without limitation and this has led to drug addicts selling clean syringes to other drug addicts to make drug money. Some drug dealers use the needle exchange to obtain a supply of large quantities of needles to sell or give to their drug buyers.

Some participants interviewed by a The Baltimore Sun in February 2000 revealed that they sell some of the new syringes obtained from the exchange in order to make drug money and did not always stop needle sharing among drug addicts.

== See also ==
- Supervised injection site
