= List of blood donation agencies in the United States =

Nearly every hospital in the United States has a blood bank and transfusion service. The following is a list of groups that collect blood for transfusion and not a complete list of blood banks.

== National organizations ==
- American Red Cross (ARC), specifically the biomedical services division. The ARC provides about 35% of transfused blood in the US.
- America's Blood Centers (ABC), North America's largest network of non-profit community blood centers. Most of the independent blood centers on this list are ABC members, and these account for approximately 60% of the U.S. blood supply.
- Blood Centers of America (BCA), a national cooperative of independent blood centers.
- Alliance for Community Transfusion Services (ACTS) is a strategic and operational alliance of independent blood centers that collect, process and distribute nearly 2 million blood products to patients in more than 750 hospitals and healthcare facilities throughout the United States. ACTS administers the nationwide emergency blood reserve program known as the Blood Emergency Readiness Corps (BERC).
- New York Blood Center enterprise Founded in 1964 is a nonprofit organization that is one of the largest independent, community-based blood centers in the world.
- Vitalant (formerly Blood Systems Inc.) is an independent nonprofit organization that collects blood from volunteer donors and provides blood, blood products and services across the United States.

== Regional organizations ==
This is a list of organizations by state or territory. Some of the names are very similar but refer to different organizations.

=== A-H ===
- Alabama
  - LifeSouth Community Blood Centers
  - OneBlood
- Alaska
  - Blood Bank of Alaska
- Arkansas
  - Arkansas Blood Institute
- California
  - Cedars Sinai Health System
  - Central California Blood Center
  - Children's Hospital Los Angeles
  - City of Hope
  - Houchin Community Blood Bank
  - LifeStream Blood Bank
  - Northern California Community Blood Bank
  - San Diego Blood Bank
  - Stanford Blood Center
  - UCI Health Blood Donor Center
  - UCLA Blood & Platelet Center
- Colorado
  - UCHealth Garth Englund Blood Center
- Delaware
  - Blood Bank of Delmarva
- Florida
  - Innovative Transfusion Medicine
  - LifeSouth Community Blood Centers
  - OneBlood
  - SunCoast Blood Centers
  - Winter Haven Hospital Community Blood Center
- Georgia
  - Atlanta Blood Services
  - LifeSouth Community Blood Centers
  - OneBlood
  - Shepeard Community Blood Center
  - The Blood Connection
- Hawaii
  - Blood Bank of Hawaii

=== I-M ===
- Illinois
  - LifeServe Blood Center
  - ImpactLife (Formerly: Mississippi Valley Regional Blood Center)
  - Community Blood Services of Illinois
  - Rock River Valley Blood Center
  - Versiti Blood Center of Illinois
- Indiana
  - South Bend Medical Foundation
  - Versiti Blood Center of Indiana
- Iowa
  - ImpactLife (Formerly: Mississippi Valley Regional Blood Center)
  - LifeServe Blood Center
- Kentucky
  - Kentucky Blood Center
  - Western Kentucky Regional Blood Center
- Louisiana
  - LifeShare Blood Center
  - Ochsner Blood Bank
  - Our Lady of the Lake Regional Medical Center
  - The Blood Center
- Michigan
  - Versiti Blood Center of Michigan
- Mississippi
  - Mississippi Blood Services
- Missouri
  - Community Blood Center (Kansas City)
  - Community Blood Center of the Ozarks
  - ImpactLife (Formerly: Mississippi Valley Regional Blood Center)

=== N-R ===
- Nebraska
  - LifeServe Blood Center
  - Nebraska Community Blood Bank
- New York
  - ConnectLife
  - New York Blood Center
- North Carolina
  - The Blood Connection
  - OneBlood
- Ohio
  - Hoxworth Blood Center
  - Versiti Blood Center of Ohio
    - Dayton Blood Donation Center
      (previously known as "Solvita Blood Center" and "Community Blood Center")
    - Mill Run Blood Donation Center, Hilliard
  - Vitalant
- Oklahoma
  - Oklahoma Blood Institute
- Oregon
  - Bloodworks Northwest
- Pennsylvania
  - Central Pennsylvania Blood Bank
  - Community Blood Bank of Northwest Pennsylvania and Western New York
  - Miller-Keystone Blood Center
- Rhode Island
  - Rhode Island Blood Center

=== S-Z ===
- South Carolina
  - The Blood Connection
  - OneBlood
- South Dakota
  - LifeServe Blood Center
- Tennessee
  - Blood Assurance
  - LIFELINE Blood Services
  - Marsh Regional Blood Center
  - MEDIC Regional Blood Center
- Texas
  - Baylor Scott & White Blood Center
  - Carter BloodCare
  - Coastal Bend Blood Center
  - Coffee Memorial Blood Center
  - Gulf Coast Regional Blood Center
  - Hendrick Regional Blood Center
  - South Texas Blood & Tissue Center
  - Texas Blood Institute
  - The University of Texas MD Anderson Cancer Center
  - We Are Blood
- Utah
  - ARUP Blood Services
- Virginia
  - Inova Blood Donor Services
- Washington
  - Bloodworks Northwest
- Wisconsin
  - ImpactLife (Formerly: Mississippi Valley Regional Blood Center)
  - Memorial Blood Centers
  - The Community Blood Center
  - Versiti Blood Center of Wisconsin

== See also ==
- Blood donation
