= Blood Emergency Readiness Corps =

US community blood center organization

The Blood Emergency Readiness Corps (known as "BERC" or the "BERC Program") consists of 38 U.S.-based community blood centers that work together to provide an emergency reserve of blood products to respond to a mass shooting or mass casualty event. The program is administered by the Alliance for Community Transfusion Services (ACTS). To date, the BERC reserve has responded to supply blood products needed as a result of the Collierville Kroger shooting (Collierville, TN), the 2021 Oxford High School shooting (Oxford Township, MI), the tornado outbreak of December 10–11, 2021 in the Mississippi Valley, the Robb Elementary School shooting (Uvalde, TX) on May 24, 2022, the tornado outbreak sequence primarily impacting Perrytown, TX in the Texas panhandle on June 15, 2023, the tornado outbreak in North Texas on May 26, 2024, the ransomware attack impacting the blood supply in the southeast U.S. on July 30, 2024, the flooding in southwest Florida as a result of Hurricane Debby on August 5, 2024, the blood needs as a result of Hurricane Milton making landfall in southwest Florida on October 9, 2024, the New Orleans truck attack of January 1, 2025, the New York Blood Center Enterprises cybersecurity incident of January 26, 2025, the tour bus crash in Western New York on August 22, 2025, , the Austin bar shooting on March 1, 2026, and a mass shooting at a collision center in Midland, Texas on June 12, 2026.

The following blood centers are participants in the program:

- Blood Assurance (Chattanooga, Tennessee)
- Bloodworks Northwest (Seattle, Washington)
- Blood Bank of Hawaii (Honolulu, Hawaii)
- Carter BloodCare (Dallas/Ft. Worth, Texas)
- Central Pennsylvania Blood Bank (Hershey, Pennsylvania)
- Coastal Bend Blood Center (Corpus Christi, Texas)
- Community Blood Center of the Ozarks (Springfield, Missouri)
- ConnectLife (Buffalo, New York)
- Gulf Coast Blood (Houston, Texas)
- Houchin Community Blood Bank (Bakersfield, California)
- Hoxworth Blood Center (Cincinnati, Ohio)
- ImpactLife (Davenport, Iowa)
- Inova Blood Donor Services (Sterling, Virginia)
- LIFELINE Blood Services (Jackson, Tennessee)
- LifeServe Blood Center (Des Moines, Iowa)
- LifeSouth Community Blood Centers (Gainesville, Florida)
- LifeStream Blood Bank (San Bernardino, California)
- Marsh Regional Blood Center (Bristol, Tennessee)
- MEDIC Regional Blood Center (Knoxville, Tennessee)
- Miller-Keystone Blood Center (Bethlehem, Pennsylvania)
- Mississippi Blood Services (Jackson, Mississippi)
- Northern California Community Blood Bank (Eureka, California)
- Our Blood Institute (Oklahoma City, Oklahoma)
- OneBlood, Inc.(Orlando, Florida)
- Rock River Valley Regional Blood Center (Rockford, Illinois)
- San Diego Blood Bank (San Diego, California)
- South Texas Blood & Tissue (San Antonio, Texas)
- South Bend Medical Foundation (South Bend, Indiana)
- Stanford Blood Center (Palo Alto, California)
- SunCoast Blood Centers (Sarasota, Florida)
- The Blood Center (New Orleans, Louisiana)
- The Blood Connection (Greenville, South Carolina)
- The Community Blood Center (Appleton, Wisconsin)
- Versiti (Milwaukee, Wisconsin)
- Versiti Ohio (Dayton, Ohio)
- Vitalant (Scottsdale, Arizona)
- We Are Blood (Austin, Texas)
- Western Kentucky Regional Blood Center (Owensboro, Kentucky)
