= Vehicle registration plates of Oklahoma =

Oklahoma vehicle license plates

Oklahoma
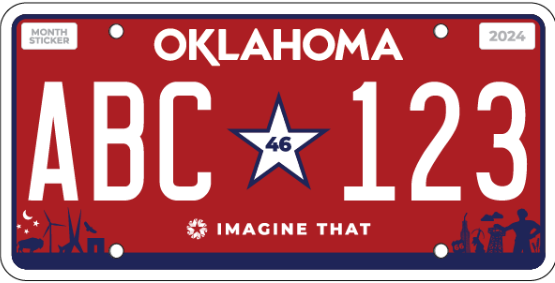

Current series
- Slogan: Imagine That
- Size: 12 in × 6 in 30 cm × 15 cm
- Material: Aluminum
- Serial format: ABC 123
- Introduced: September 1, 2024
- Designer: Freestyle Creative

Availability
- Issued by: Service Oklahoma

History
- First issued: July 1, 1915

The U.S. state of Oklahoma first required its residents to register their motor vehicles and display license plates in 1915. As of 2026, plates are issued by Service Oklahoma. Only rear plates have been required since 1944.

Prior to July 1, 2019, plates belonged to the car, not the owner. As a result of lost turnpike toll revenue and law enforcement having trouble tracking vehicle owners, the law was changed, meaning plates now belong to vehicle owners and can be transferred from a previous vehicle to a new vehicle.

== Passenger baseplates ==
=== 1915 to 1978 ===
In 1956, the United States, Canada, and Mexico came to an agreement with the American Association of Motor Vehicle Administrators, the Automobile Manufacturers Association and the National Safety Council that standardized the size for license plates for vehicles (except those for motorcycles) at 6 inches (15 cm) in height by 12 inches (30 cm) in width, with standardized mounting holes. The 1955 (dated 1956) issue was the first Oklahoma license plate that complied with these standards.

Image	Dates issued	Design	Slogan	Serial format	Serials issued	Notes
12345	1915	Embossed blue serial on white plate; vertical "OKLA" and "1915" at left and right respectively	none	12345	4001 to approximately 33500, with gaps	Single series of serials used for all classes of vehicles, with blocks reserved for non-passenger classes. This practice continued in one form or another through 1938.
12345	1916	Embossed white serial on blue plate; vertical "OKLA" and "1916" at left and right respectively	none	12345	2501 to approximately 60500, with gaps	
123456	1917	Embossed white serial on brown plate; vertical "OKLA" and "1917" at left and right respectively	none	123456	6501 to approximately 118500, with gaps	
123456	1918	Embossed yellow serial on green plate; vertical "OKLA" and "1918" at left and right respectively	none	123456	18001 to approximately 131500	
123456	1919	Embossed green serial on yellow plate with border line; vertical "OKLA" and "1919" at left and right respectively	none	123456	8001 to approximately 156500	
123456	1920	Embossed white serial on blue plate with border line; vertical "OKLA" and "1920" at left and right respectively	none	123456	8001 to approximately 212000	
123456	1921	Embossed white serial on brown plate with border line; vertical "OKLA" and "1921" at left and right respectively	none	123456	10001 to approximately 231500, with gaps	
123-456	1922	Embossed black serial on turquoise plate with border line; vertical "OKLA" and "1922" at left and right respectively	none	123-456	11-001 to approximately 261-000, with gaps	
123-456	1923	Embossed white serial on maroon plate with border line; vertical "OKLA" and "1923" at left and right respectively	none	123-456	18-001 to approximately 313-000	
	1924	Embossed white serial on olive green plate with border line; vertical "OKLA" and "1924" at left and right respectively	none	123F456; 123.456		Plates with an 'F' in the serial were issued on Fords. This practice continued through 1928.
No image	1925	Embossed silver serial on black plate; silver lines at top and bottom borders; "1925 OKLA" at right	none	123F456; 123.456		
No image	1926	Embossed black serial on yellow plate; black lines at top and bottom borders; "OKLA 1926" at bottom	none	123F456; 123-456		
123F456	1927	Embossed yellow serial on black plate with border line; "OKLA 1927" at bottom	none	123F456	30F001 to approximately 375F000	
123F456	1927	Embossed yellow serial on black plate with border line; "OKLA 1927" at bottom	none	123-456	495-001 to approximately 674-000	
123F456	1928	Embossed black serial on yellow plate with border line; vertical "OKLA" and "1928" at left and right respectively	none	123F456	35F001 to approximately 370F000	
123F456	1928	Embossed black serial on yellow plate with border line; vertical "OKLA" and "1928" at left and right respectively	none	123-456	480-001 to approximately 727-000	
123-456	1929	Embossed yellow serial on black plate with border line; "OK–29" centered at top	none	123-456	50-001 to approximately 571-000	
123-456	1930	Embossed black serial on yellow plate with border line; "OKLA–1930" centered at bottom	none	123-456	60-001 to approximately 597-000	
123-456	1931	Embossed yellow serial on black plate with border line; "OKLA–1931" centered at bottom	none	123-456	60-001 to approximately 564-000	
123-456	1932	Embossed black serial on yellow plate with border line; "OKLAHOMA-1932" at top	none	123-456	60-001 to approximately 464-000	First use of the full state name.
	1933	Embossed yellow serial on black plate with border line; "OKLAHOMA-1933" at bottom	none	123-456	60-001 to approximately 481-000	
123A456	1934	Embossed black serial on yellow plate with border line; "OKLAHOMA-1934" at top	none	123A456	60A001 to approximately 507A000	
123A456	1935	Embossed black serial on white plate with border line; "1935-OKLAHOMA" at bottom	none	123A456	60A001 to approximately 510A000	
	1936	Embossed black serial on yellow plate with border line; "1936-OKLAHOMA" at top	none	123-456	60-001 to approximately 516-000	Front and rear plates required; rear plates used an 'R' as the separator in the serial.
	1937	Embossed yellow serial on black plate with border line; "1937-OKLAHOMA" at bottom	none	123-456	60-001 to approximately 528-000	Front plates used an 'F' as the separator in the serial, while rear plates used an 'R'.
	1938	Embossed black serial on yellow plate with border line; "OKLAHOMA-1938" at top	none	123-456	60-001 to approximately 546-000	
	1939	Embossed black serial on silver plate with border line; "OK–39" at bottom, offset to right	none	A/B123	County-coded (A/B)	
No image	1940	Embossed black serial on yellow plate with border line; "OKLA–1940" at top	none	1-12345; 10-1234	County-coded (1 or 10)	
No image	1941	Embossed white serial on black plate with border line; "OKLA—1941" at bottom	none	1-12345; 10-1234	County-coded (1 or 10)	
	1942–43	Embossed dark blue serial on white plate with border line; "OKLA-1942" at top	none	1-12345; 10-1234	County-coded (1 or 10)	Revalidated for 1943 with windshield stickers, due to metal conservation for World War II.
No image	1944	Embossed black serial on yellow plate with border line; "OKLAHOMA–44" at top	none	1-12345; 10-1234	County-coded (1 or 10)	Only rear plates issued; this practice continues today.
No image	1945	Embossed orange serial on black plate with border line; "OKLAHOMA–45" at bottom	none	1-12345; 10-1234	County-coded (1 or 10)	
	1946–47	Embossed white serial on black plate with border line; "OKLAHOMA–46" at top	none	1-12345; 10-1234	County-coded (1 or 10)	Revalidated for 1947 with yellow tabs.
No image	1948	Embossed black serial on yellow plate with border line; "OKLAHOMA–48" at bottom	none	1-12345; 10-1234	County-coded (1 or 10)	
No image	1949	Embossed white serial on black plate with border line; "49–OKLAHOMA" at top	none	1-12345; 10-1234	County-coded (1 or 10)	
No image	1950	Embossed black serial on white plate with border line; "50–OKLAHOMA" at bottom	none	1-12345; 1-A1234; 10-1234; 10-A123	County-coded (1 or 10)	
No image	1951	Embossed black serial on yellow plate with border line; "51–OKLAHOMA" at top	none	1-12345; 1-A1234; 10-1234; 10-A123	County-coded (1 or 10)	
	1952	Embossed white serial on black plate with border line; "52–OKLAHOMA" at bottom	none	1-12345; 1-A1234; 10-1234; 10-A123	County-coded (1 or 10)	
	1953	Embossed black serial on yellow plate with border line; "OKLAHOMA–53" at top	none	1-12345; 1-A1234; 10-1234; 10-A123	County-coded (1 or 10)	
	1954	Embossed yellow serial on black plate with border line; "54-OKLAHOMA" at bottom	none	1-12345; 1-A1234; 10-1234; 10-A123	County-coded (1 or 10)	
	1955	Embossed white serial on black plate with border line; "55" at top right	"VISIT OKLAHOMA" at top, offset to left	1-12345; 1-A1234; 10-1234; 10-A123	County-coded (1 or 10)	
No image	1956	Embossed black serial on white plate with border line; "56" at bottom right	"VISIT OKLAHOMA" at bottom, offset to left	1-123456; 10-12345	County-coded (1 or 10)	
No image	1957	Embossed white serial on black plate with border line; "57" at top right	"VISIT OKLAHOMA" at top, offset to left	1-123456; 10-12345	County-coded (1 or 10)	
	1958	Embossed black serial on white plate with border line; "58" at top right	"VISIT OKLAHOMA" at top, offset to left	1-123456; 10-12345	County-coded (1 or 10)	
	1959	Embossed white serial on black plate with border line; "59" at top right	"VISIT OKLAHOMA" at top, offset to left	1-123456; 10-12345	County-coded (1 or 10)	
	1960	Embossed black serial on white plate; "19" at top left and "60" at top right	"VISIT OKLAHOMA" centered at top	1-123456; 10-12345	County-coded (1 or 10)	
	1961	Embossed white serial on black plate; "19" at top left and "61" at top right	"VISIT OKLAHOMA" centered at top	1-123456; 10-12345	County-coded (1 or 10)	
	1962	Embossed black serial on white plate; "19" at top left and "62" at top right	"VISIT OKLAHOMA" centered at top	1-123456; 10-12345	County-coded (1 or 10)	
	1963	Embossed white serial on black plate with border line; "19 OKLAHOMA 63" at top	none	AB-1234	County-coded	Two-letter county codes introduced. Serials with numbers below 1000 used leading zeros; this happened again in 1964.
	1964	Embossed black serial on white plate; "19 OKLAHOMA 64" at top	none	AB-1234	County-coded	
	1965	Embossed white serial on black plate; "19 OKLAHOMA 65" at top	none	AB-1234	County-coded	
	1966	Embossed black serial on white plate; "19 OKLAHOMA 66" at top	none	AB-1234	County-coded	
	1967	Embossed red serial on reflective white plate; "67" at top left	"OKLAHOMA IS OK" at top, offset to right	AB-1234	County-coded	Issued in the colors of the University of Oklahoma.
	1968	Embossed black serial on reflective orange plate; "68" at top left	"OKLAHOMA IS OK" at top, offset to right	AB-1234	County-coded	Issued in the colors of Oklahoma State University.
	1969	Embossed red serial on reflective white plate; "69" at top left	"OKLAHOMA IS OK" at top, offset to right	AB-1234	County-coded	Issued in the colors of the University of Oklahoma.
	1970	Embossed green serial on reflective white plate; "70" at top left	"OKLAHOMA IS OK" at top, offset to right	AB-1234	County-coded	
	1971	Embossed red serial on reflective white plate; "71" at top left	"OKLAHOMA IS OK" at top, offset to right	AB-1234; ABC-1234	County-coded	Three-letter county codes introduced in some counties that had exhausted their two-letter allocations.
	1972	Embossed green serial on reflective white plate; "72" at top left	"OKLAHOMA IS OK" at top, offset to right	AB-1234; ABC-1234	County-coded	
	1973	Embossed red serial on reflective white plate; "73" at top left	"OKLAHOMA IS OK" at top, offset to right	AB-1234; ABC-1234	County-coded	Carried over into 1974 after the plate shop at Oklahoma State Penitentiary was hit by fire during a riot in July 1973, destroying the supply of 1974 plates (below).
	1973–74	As above, but with border line	"OKLAHOMA IS OK" at top, offset to right	AB-1234; ABC-1234	County-coded	Supplemental plates manufactured by Polyvend Inc. of Arkansas while the prison plate shop was being repaired.
	(1974)	Embossed green serial on reflective white plate; "74" at top left	"OKLAHOMA IS OK" at top, offset to right	AB-1234; ABC-1234	County-coded	Most of these plates were destroyed in the prison plate shop fire of July 1973 (above); salvaged plates were not issued.
	1975	Embossed green serial on reflective white plate with border line; "75" at top left	"OKLAHOMA IS OK" at top, offset to right	AB-1234; ABC-1234	County-coded	Manufactured by Polyvend Inc. while the prison plate shop was being repaired.
	1976	Embossed red serial on reflective white plate with border line; "19 OKLAHOMA 76" at top	"1776 BICENTENNIAL 1976" at bottom	AB-1234; ABC-1234	County-coded	
	1977	Embossed green serial on reflective white plate with border line; "77" at top left	"OKLAHOMA IS OK" at top, offset to right	AB-1234; ABC-1234	County-coded	
	1978	Embossed red serial on reflective white plate with border line; "78" at top left	"OKLAHOMA IS OK" at top, offset to right	AB-1234; ABC-1234	County-coded	

=== 1979 to present ===
Image	Dates issued	Design	Slogan	Serial format	Serials issued	Notes
	1979–80	Embossed blue serial on reflective white plate; "OKLAHOMA" centered at top; debossed sticker boxes in top corners with "79" further debossed in right box	none	AB-1234; ABC-1234	County-coded	Monthly staggered registration introduced.
	1981–82	Embossed green serial with state-shaped separator on reflective white plate; debossed sticker boxes in top corners with "81" further debossed in right box	"OKLAHOMA IS OK" centered at top	AB-1234; ABC-1234	County-coded	Revalidated with stickers until 2009.
	1983–88	Embossed green serial with state-shaped separator on reflective white plate; yellow band screened at bottom with a yellow sun and "Oklahoma" in black in the middle; sticker boxes debossed in bottom corners	"is OK!" screened in black centered below state name, giving "Oklahoma is OK!"	ABC-123	County-coded	Commonly known as the "sunbelt" plate. Revalidated with stickers until 2009.
	1989–94	Embossed green serial on reflective white plate; battle shield of the Osage Nation screened in the center; "OKLAHOMA" screened in black centered at top	"OK!" screened in tan centered between state name and battle shield	ABC 123	County-coded	Awarded "Plate of the Year" for best new license plate of 1989 by the Automobile License Plate Collectors Association, the first time Oklahoma was so honored. Co-recipient with Nova Scotia. Serials in each county continued from where the 1983–88 plates left off, with leading zeros added in numbers below 100. Revalidated with stickers until 2009.
	1994–2008	Similar to 1989–94 base, but with larger state name and debossed area in center containing redrawn battle shield graphic	"NATIVE AMERICA" screened in red centered at bottom	ABC 123	County-coded	Final embossed plate. Serials in each county continued from where the 1989–94 plates left off, with the 123 ABC format introduced in counties that had exhausted their ABC 123 allocations. Revalidated with stickers until 2009.
	1994–2008	Similar to 1989–94 base, but with larger state name and debossed area in center containing redrawn battle shield graphic	"NATIVE AMERICA" screened in red centered at bottom	123 ABC	County-coded	Final embossed plate. Serials in each county continued from where the 1989–94 plates left off, with the 123 ABC format introduced in counties that had exhausted their ABC 123 allocations. Revalidated with stickers until 2009.
	January 2009 – December 2016	Screened red serial on reflective white plate; Allan Houser's "Sacred Rain Arrow" sculpture (outside the Gilcrease Museum in Tulsa) screened against cloudy blue sky at left and blue bar screened at bottom; "OKLAHOMA" screened in dark blue centered at top	"NATIVE AMERICA" screened in white in center of blue bar, with white Osage Nation battle shield at right	123ABC	001AAA to approximately 999QJX	First screened plate. Mandatory plate replacement introduced, all plates from 1981–2008 were replaced. Awarded "Plate of the Year" for best new license plate of 2009 by the Automobile License Plate Collectors Association, the third time Oklahoma was so honored. County coding discontinued; the county of issuance has been printed on the month revalidation sticker since 2010. 'C', 'N' and 'O' series of serials not issued; some serials carried over from 1994–2008 plates. Only issuing three-letter combinations that have not yet appeared in 1994-2009 123-ABC plates.
	January 2017 – March 2022	Screened black serial with state-shaped separator on reflective graphic plate with white scissor-tailed flycatcher against blue landscape featuring mountains, badlands and water	"EXPLORE OKLAHOMA" screened in black centered at top; "TRAVELOK.COM" screened in red centered at bottom	ABC-123 (Sometimes 123-ABC)	Exclusively from AAA-001 to LYZ-999; intermittently for 'LZ' serials	Mandatory replacement of all 2009-2016 plates, with some serials carried over from them. Still valid for renewals and transfers.
	March 2022 –August 2024	Screened black serial with state-shaped separator on reflective graphic plate with white scissor-tailed flycatcher against blue landscape featuring mountains, badlands and water	"OKLAHOMA" screened in black centered at top; "TRAVELOK.COM" screened in red centered at bottom	ABC-123 (Sometimes 123-ABC)	Intermittently for 'LZ' serials; MAA-001 (Note: Some plates in the NB- to ND- range were observed with the previous "EXPLORE" legend.) to PZH-999 (Note: Only PXH, PYH and PZH following PXA. Some unused earlier 'P' combinations were filled in on the next base (see below).)	Mandatory replacement of all 2009-2016 plates, with some serials carried over from them. Still valid for renewals and transfers.
	September 2024 –Present	Screened white serial with white star-shaped separator on reflective red plate, featuring smaller images screened in blue along the bottom	"OKLAHOMA" screened in white centered at top; "IMAGINE THAT" screened in white centered at bottom	ABC-123	Intermittently PNU-001 to PZG-999; Exclusively PZJ-001 to VXY-261 (as of November 8th, 2025)[5]	Only issued if vehicle buyers do not have an existing scissor-tailed flycatcher plate to transfer from their prior vehicle, or if a buyer chooses to purchase the new design.

== County coding ==
The order of the numeric county codes used from 1952–61 was based on the populations of each county according to the 1950 United States census, and the order of the codes used in 1962 was based on the populations of each county according to the 1960 census, in 2009 county codes were reintroduced on month stickers. As of 2025, both the county abbreviated and the month only abbreviation is currently being used. However, as of 2024, the county abbreviated decal is no longer being issued by the state.

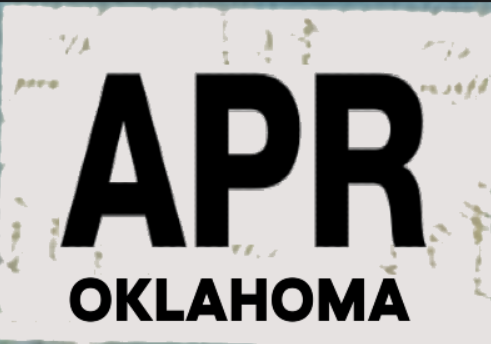
Month decal without county abbreviation.

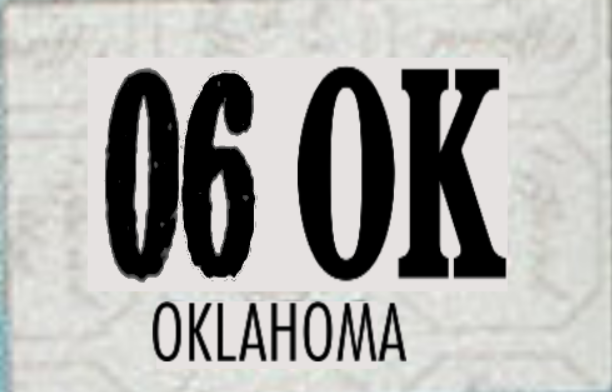
Month decal with county abbreviation (abbreviations listed below)

County	Numeric codes, 1952–61	Numeric codes, 1962	2-letter codes, 1963–82	3-letter codes in ABC-123, 1981–2009	3-letter codes, in 123-ABC, 1994-2009	Month Stickers 2009–2024
Adair	46	46	AD, AR	"..." means the same as left, with another letter appended to it...., AI*, AJA-AJT (noted AJA-T)	left blank if this county has no 123-ABC plates	AD
Alfalfa	62	62	AL	...		AL
Atoka	51	57	AT	..., AU*		AT
Beaver	73	69	BV	..., BWA-I		BV
Beckham	29	35	BK, BE	..., BF*, BGA-U		BK
Blaine	45	49	BL	..., BA*		BL
Bryan	25	27	BR, BY	..., BN*, BS*, BD*		BR
Caddo	16	20	CA, CD	...	CA*, COA-S, KAA-N	CD
Canadian	26	26	CN, CX	..., UN*, UX*, UYA-J	CN*, CP*, CX*, NAA-NDA	CN
Carter	14	12	CR, CE	..., UE*	CE*, CR*, CT*, RAA-E	CR
Cherokee	37	36	CZ	..., UZ*, UHA-D	CZ*, CH*, UAA-C	CH
Choctaw	32	39	CW	..., UWA-J	CW*, HAB-O	CW
Cimarron	77	77	CI	CMA-N		CI
Cleveland	11	7	CL, CV, CY, CF	..., VA*, VL*, VB*-VK*, VMA-VYB	VXN-O	CL
Coal	71	74	CO	...		CO
Comanche	4	3	CC, CH, CM, CB, CP	... (except CM*), UC*, UD*, UBA-U, UIA-G	CF*, CB*-CD*, CJ*, CM*, EAA-EDT	CM
Cotton	66	65	CT	... A-U only (CTA-CTU)		CT
Craig	39	37	CG	..., UGA-L	CG*, CIC-U	CG
Creek	10	11	CK, CJ, CU	..., UK*, UJA-G	CK*, CQ*, JAA-X	CK
Custer	30	28	CS	..., CU*, UUA-I	CU*, CSA-B, CVA-L, DAA-R	CU
Delaware	47	45	DL, DE	..., DR*, DAA-DDI		DL
Dewey	68	70	DW	... A-V only		DW
Ellis	75	75	EL	... A-Q only		EL
Garfield	5	5	GA, GR, GF, GB, GL	..., GC*, GG*-GK*, GSA-G		GF
Garvin	24	22	GV, GN	..., GOA-GQU		GV
Grady	17	18	GD, GY	..., GZ*, GX*, GW*, GMA-J		GY
Grant	64	64	GT	... A-Q appended only		GT
Greer	59	60	GE	... A-W appended only		GR
Harmon	70	73	HM	... A-K only		HM
Harper	76	71	HP	..., HRA-B		HP
Haskell	54	58	HK	..., HLA-B, HSA-K		HK
Hughes	31	40	HG	..., HH*, HUA-M		HU
Jackson	33	17	JA, JK, JS, JX	..., JCA-U		JA
Jefferson	60	63	JE	JF*		JE
Johnston	63	61	JN	..., JOA-P		JO
Kay	6	6	KA, KY, KK	..., KB*-KE*, KJA-U		KA
Kingfisher	55	54	KF	..., KG*		KF
Kiowa	38	41	KW	..., KX*		KW
Latimer	67	67	LA	... A-M only		LA
Le Flore	15	19	LE, LF, LR	..., LS*, LU*, LX*, LJ*, LMA-P		LF
Lincoln	28	31	LN, LL	..., LC*, LD*		LI
Logan	27	32	LG, LO	..., LP*, LH*		LG
Love	72	72	LV	..., LWA-W		LV
Major	65	66	MA	...	MAA-K	MJ
Marshall	69	68	MR	..., MM*	MRA-M	MR
Mayes	35	30	ME, MY	..., MX*, MW*	MYA-MZR	MY
McClain	48	47	ML, MN	..., MP*	ML*, MNA-C	ML
McCurtain	22	25	MC, MT	..., MD*, MQ*	MC*, MTA-G	MC
McIntosh	40	48	MO	..., MHA-MIZ	MIB-G	MI
Murray	61	55	MU	..., MV*		MU
Muskogee	3	4	MK, MG, MS, MB	..., MJ*, MF*	MG*, MK*, MS*, MU*, MEB-M	MK
Noble	57	56	NB	..., NCA-U		NB
Nowata	56	53	NW	..., NOA-K		NW
Okfuskee	43	51	OK	..., OFA-E		OF
Oklahoma	1	1	XA-YZ	..., Q**, F**	XAA-XWM	OK
Okmulgee	8	14	OM, OL	..., ON*, OP*, OUA-S		OM
Osage	19	16	OS, OA, OE, OG	..., OBA-ODB		OS
Ottawa	21	21	OT, OW	..., OXA-OZZ, OVA-S		OT
Pawnee	53	52	PW	..., PX*	PWA-H	PW
Payne	7	8	PA, PY, PF	..., PZ*, PL*, PG*, PV*	PY*, PAA-S	PY
Pittsburg	12	15	PB, PS	..., PP*, PQ*, PI*	PB*, PSA-E, PSJ	PI
Pontotoc	23	23	PN, PC	..., PO*, PR*	PNA-P	PO
Pottawatomie	9	10	PT, PE, PD	PT*, PD*, PJ*, PK*	PT*, PO*, PE*, PMA-I	PT
Pushmataha	58	59	PM	..., PU*	PUA-B	PU
Roger Mills	74	76	RM	... A-N only	RMH-N	RM
Rogers	36	29	RG, RE, RO, RR	..., RF*, RH*, RS*, RAA-RBK		RG
Seminole	13	24	SM, SE	..., SF*, SI*, SLA		SM
Sequoyah	34	34	SY, SH	..., SZ*, SA*-SC*, SQ*, SO*		SQ
Stephens	18	13	ST, SP, SN	..., SR*, SUA-SXW		ST
Texas	52	43	TX, TS	...	TX*, TSA	TX
Tillman	42	42	TL	.., TTA-L		TI
Tulsa	2	2	ZA-ZZ	ZA*-ZY*, I**, T**	ZAA-ZZE	TU
Wagoner	44	38	WG, WN	..., WO*, WR*, WE*, WVA-I		WG
Washington	20	9	WA, WH, WS, WI	..., WJ*, WK*, WM*, WQA-J		WS
Washita	41	33	WT	..., WUA-J		WT
Woods	49	50	WD	..., WFA-E		WD
Woodward	50	44	WW, WB	..., WCA-W		WW

== Non-passenger plates ==
Image	Type	Dates issued	Design	Slogan	Serial format	Serials issued	Notes
	Commercial Truck	January 2017 – present	Screened black serial with state-shaped separator on reflective graphic plate with white scissor-tailed flycatcher against blue landscape featuring mountains, badlands and water	"EXPLORE OKLAHOMA" or "OKLAHOMA" screened in black centered at top; "COML TRUCK" screened in black centered at bottom	V12-345 123-45V; 12C-345	T, C, X, Y at both front and the end. I00000-I99999, Z00000- approx. Z59999 V00000-99999V 00C000 - today	Note: This plate is replaced by the Imagine That plate in Sep 2024. However, scissortail flycatcher plates are still being used.
	Exempt	January 2017 – present	Screened black serial with state-shaped separator on reflective graphic plate with white scissor-tailed flycatcher against blue landscape featuring mountains, badlands and water	"EXPLORE OKLAHOMA" or "OKLAHOMA" screened in black centered at top; "TAX EXEMPT" screened in black centered at bottom	E12-345		Note: This plate is replaced by the Imagine That plate in Sep 2024. However, scissortail flycatcher plates are still being used.
	Non-expiring Trailer	January 2017 – present	Screened black serial with state-shaped separator on reflective graphic plate with white scissor-tailed flycatcher against blue landscape featuring mountains, badlands and water	"EXPLORE OKLAHOMA" or "OKLAHOMA" screened in black centered at top; "NON EXP TRAILER" screened in black centered at bottom	1234-AB AB-1234		Note: This plate is replaced by the Imagine That plate in Sep 2024. However, scissortail flycatcher plates are still being used.
	Non-expiring Truck	January 2017 – present	Screened black serial with state-shaped separator on reflective graphic plate with white scissor-tailed flycatcher against blue landscape featuring mountains, badlands and water	"EXPLORE OKLAHOMA" or "OKLAHOMA" screened in black centered at top; "NON EXP TRUCK" screened in black centered at bottom	1 N/Y/C-234		Note: This plate is replaced by the Imagine That plate in Sep 2024. However, scissortail flycatcher plates are still being used.
	City	January 2017 – September 2024	Screened black serial with state-shaped separator on reflective graphic plate with white scissor-tailed flycatcher against blue landscape featuring mountains, badlands and water	"EXPLORE OKLAHOMA" or "OKLAHOMA" screened in black centered at top; "CITY" screened in black centered at bottom	C/I-12345	C/I-00001 to C/I-99999	Note: This plate is replaced by the Imagine That plate in September 2024. However, scissortail flycatcher plates are still being used.
	City (New)	September 2024 – Present	Screened white serial with original 46 state flag star separator on reflective graphic plate with red background with Oklahoma landmarks.	"OKLAHOMA" screened in white centered at top; "CITY" screened in white centered at bottom	C/I-12345	C/I-00001 to C/I-99999	

== Optional plates ==
Image	Type	Dates issued	Design	Serial format	Serials issued	Notes
	Aviation		Black serial on a sunset landscape, two planes flying on either side and an airport runway at the bottom. Oklahoma screened in black at the top and AVIATION screened in white at the bottom with two wings on each side.	A/V 12345	A/V 00001 to present	Supports the Oklahoma Aeronautics Commission Revolving Fund
	Department of Wildlife Conservation - Bass			123B4	001B1 to present	
	Department of Wildlife Conservation - Deer			123D4	001D1 to present	
	Department of Wildlife Conservation - Mallard			123J4	001J1 to present	
	Department of Wildlife Conservation - Lizard			123L4	001L1 to present	
	Department of Wildlife Conservation - Striper			123P4	001P1 to present	
	Department of Wildlife Conservation - Quail			123Q4	001Q1 to present	
	Department of Wildlife Conservation - Scissortail			123S4	001S1 to present	
	Department of Wildlife Conservation - Turkey			123T4	001T1 to present	
	Ducks Unlimited		Black serial on a purple and orange gradient background, a flying mallard is in the middle of the registration. A black screened Ducks Unlimited logo is present on the lower right corner, the mallard head of this same logo is also present in faded in the background, much larger. OKLAHOMA screened in black at the top, DUCKS UNLIMITED screened in black at the bottom.	DU1 234	DU0 001 to present	
	In God We Trust		White serial on blue background with national flag, "In God We Trust" screened in white on left. OKLAHOMA screened in white at the top.	G/T 1234	G/T 0001 to present	Identical to "In God We Trust" 2008 Indiana plates.
	National Weather Center		Light blue serial on a sunset sky, NWC in the middle of the registration. OKLAHOMA screened in orange at the top, National Weather Center and EDUCATION-RESEARCH-OPERATIONS screened in white at the bottom with two wings on each side.	WX1 234	WX1 001 to present	
	Oklahoma Blood Institute		Black serial on a white background, Oklahoma Blood Institute with logo at the left. OKLAHOMA screened in black at the top and FEEL GOOD. GIVE BLOOD. screened in light blue at the bottom.	123OBI	001OBI to present	
	Pioneers of the Prairie		White serial on a gradient red background with an American bison on the left. OKLAHOMA screened in black at the top and Pioneers of the Prairie screened in white at the bottom.	NC1234	NC0001 to present	
	Save the Monarchs	2020–present	Black screened serial on multicolored background, features a monarch butterfly to the left of the serial and "Save the Monarchs" below the serial.	SM1234	SM0001 to present	Awarded "Plate of the Year" for best new license plate of 2020 by the Automobile License Plate Collectors Association, the fourth time Oklahoma was so honored.
	"State Parks" – Pavilion	2004–present	Black on multicolored background.	O/P 1234	O/P 1 to present	Awarded "Plate of the Year" for best new license plate of 2004 by the Automobile License Plate Collectors Association, the second time Oklahoma was so honored.
	Support Education		White serial on a sunset landscape, a house on the left and grass at the bottom. OKLAHOMA screened in white at the top and SUPPORT EDUCATION screened in white at the bottom.	L0001E	L0001E to present	
	Tulsa Zoo		Black serial on a white background, a brown giraffe at the top right corner of the plate until to the middle, TulsaZoo AND LIVING MUSEUM with logo screened in orange in the left corner. The logo is also screened in very light orange below the giraffe's head, in the middle of the registration. OKLAHOMA screened in black at the bottom.	TZ1 234	TZ0 001 to present	

=== Personalized plates ===
Image	Type	Dates issued	Design	Serial format	Serials issued	Notes
	White		Black serial on reflective white plate; "OKLAHOMA" centered at top	various	various	
	Silver Gray		Black serial on reflective silver gray plate; "OKLAHOMA" centered at top	various	various	
	Sand		Black serial on reflective sand plate; "OKLAHOMA" centered at top	various	various	
	Sea Green		Black serial on reflective sea green plate; "OKLAHOMA" centered at top	various	various	
	Chamois		Black serial on reflective chamois plate; "OKLAHOMA" centered at top	various	various	
	Sky Blue		Black serial on reflective sky blue plate; "OKLAHOMA" centered at top	various	various	
