= Osborn v. Irwin Memorial Blood Bank =

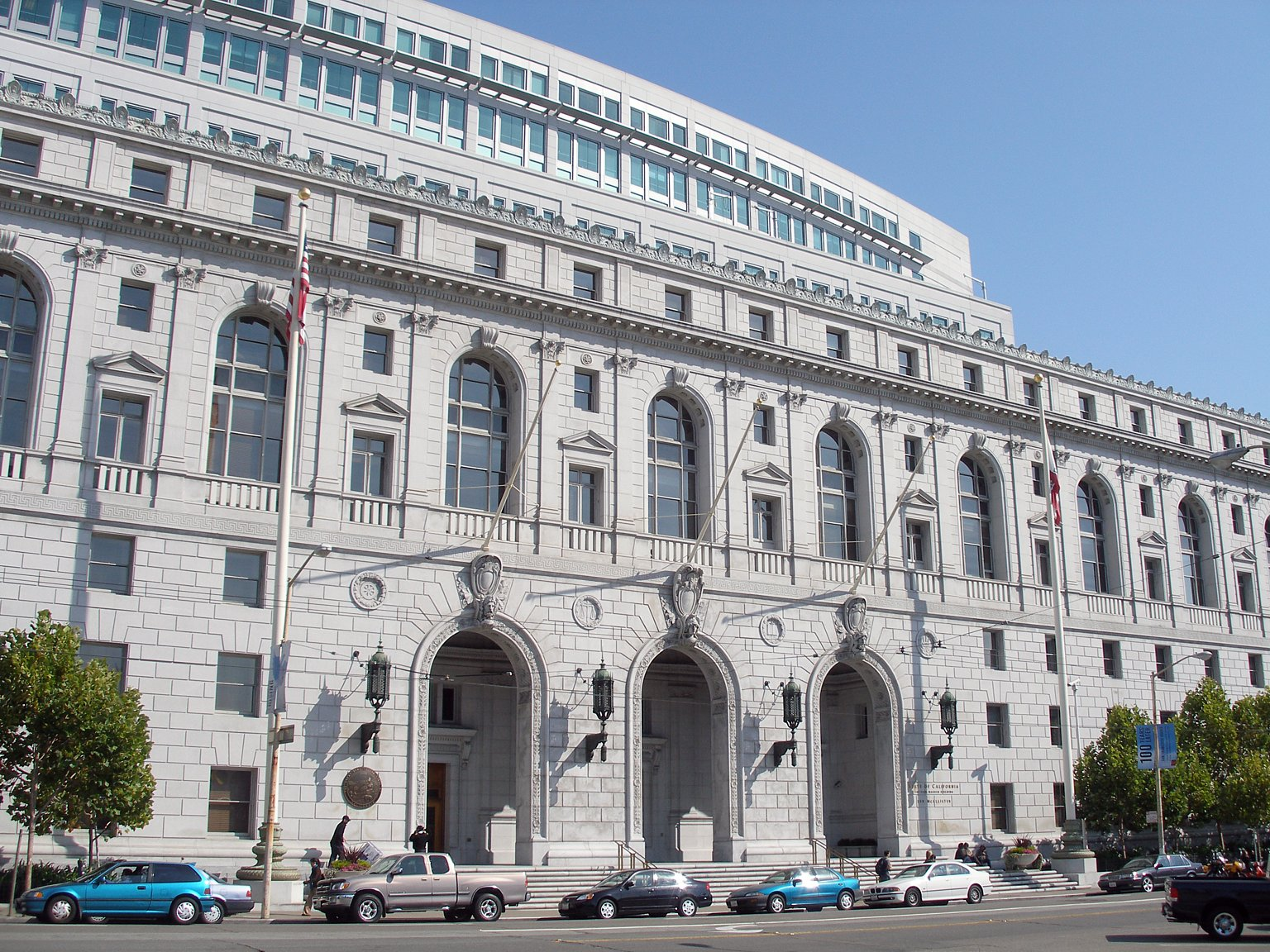
- Court: Court of Appeals of California
- Full case name: Paul Osborn et al., Plaintiffs and Appellants, versus Irwin Memorial Blood Bank et al., Defendants and Appellants
- Decided: 04/08/1992
- Citations: 5 Cal.App.4th 234 (1992); 7 Cal. Rptr.2d 101

Court membership
- Judges sitting: Perley, Anderson, and Poche

In Osborn v. Irwin Memorial Blood Bank, 5 Cal.App.4th 234 (1992), the Court of Appeals of California considered certain questions pertaining to whether a blood bank could be held liable for negligence or negligent misrepresentation after a patient contracted HIV/AIDS as a result of a blood transfusion.

== Factual background ==
In 1983, Michael Osborn, an infant, underwent surgery to repair a congenital heart defect. During that surgery, Osborn received a blood transfusion. At the time of the transfusion, donated blood was not routinely tested for human immunodeficiency virus, because the cause of AIDS had not definitively been identified yet.

Fearing that AIDS could be transmitted by blood, the Osborns had requested to make directed blood donations specifically earmarked for use by Michael. They first contacted the surgeon, who informed them that they needed to contact the blood bank. The receptionist at the blood bank, however, said that directed donations were not allowed, and so the surgery proceeded using blood from the public supply. He subsequently was diagnosed with acquired immune deficiency syndrome (AIDS).

== The trial ==
The patient and his family sued the University of California (where the surgery occurred) and the Irwin Memorial Blood Bank (which supplied the blood) for multiple causes of action. A jury trial took place. The blood bank introduced evidence that its safety procedures were at least as good as those generally prevailing at the time. The blood bank also sought to introduce evidence that, because the patient was type A negative, he could not receive any donations from members of his family, as a result of which only a small amount of blood (or no blood at all) would have been able to be provided by means of directed donation, but the judge did not allow defendants to present this evidence to the jury.

At the conclusion of the evidence the trial judge granted the defendants' motions for nonsuit on several of the causes of action, and directed a verdict in favor of the university on the remaining causes of action. Thus, only the blood bank remained as a defendant, and the following questions were submitted to the jury:

- Was the blood bank negligent?
- Did the blood bank commit the tort of intentional misrepresentation when the receptionist stated that directed blood donations were not allowed?
- Did the blood bank commit the tort of negligent misrepresentation when the receptionist stated that directed blood donations were not allowed?

The jury returned a general verdict in favor of the plaintiffs and awarded them a total of $750,000. The blood bank moved for judgment notwithstanding the verdict and also moved for an amended judgment on the grounds that the damages awarded were in excess of those allowed under the Medical Injury Compensation Reform Act (MICRA). The trial court acknowledged that it had erred when it had held that MICRA did not apply, and the blood bank moved for a new trial.

The court granted the blood bank's motion for judgment notwithstanding the verdict as to the counts of negligence and intentional misrepresentation and, conditioned on the plaintiffs' acceptance, reduced the award to $416,307. Both sides appealed.

== The appeal ==
There were three issues on appeal:

- Did the trial court err in granting judgment notwithstanding the verdict in favor of the defendant on the count of negligence?
- Should there be a new trial on the count of negligent misrepresentation?
  - Did the trial court err in excluding evidence regarding the patient's blood type?
  - If the trial court erred, should it grant a new trial or grant a directed verdict in favor of the defendants?
- Did the trial court err in dismissing the case against the university?

The California Court of Appeals ruled in favor of defendants on the count of negligence, held that the defendants were entitled to a new trial on the issue of negligent misrepresentation, and ruled in favor of the university.
