= OneBlood =

American non-profit blood bank

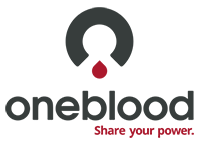
- Founded: January 27, 2012
- Type: 501(c)(3) non-profit
- Tax ID no.: 59-3145469
- Location: 8669 Commodity Circle, Orlando, Florida
- Coordinates: 28°26′57″N 81°25′49″W
- Region served: Southeastern United States
- Products: blood, blood products
- Services: phlebotomy, apheresis
- Key people: Cliff Numark (CEO)
- Affiliations: List: America’s Blood Centers (ABC); American Association of Blood Banks (AABB); South Central Association of Blood Banks (SCABB); Foundation for the Accreditation of Cellular Therapy (FACT)
- Revenue: $458,501,635 (2024)
- Expenses: $479,031,518 (2024)
- Employees: 3,645 (2024)
- Volunteers: 2
- Website: www.oneblood.org
- Formerly called: Florida Georgia Blood Alliance, Jacksonville Blood Bank, Community Blood Center of the Carolinas

OneBlood, Inc. is a not-for-profit blood bank serving the Southeastern U.S. states of Alabama, Florida, Georgia, North Carolina, and South Carolina. Based in Orlando, Florida, it is designated as a 501(c)(3) organization.

The organization was formed in 2012, as a result of the merger of three Florida-based blood banks, upon which it became the state's largest blood bank. Some local blood banks feared the merger would create a monopoly and drive up costs for blood. In 2015, it merged with the Jacksonville-based Blood Alliance, further expanding its service area.

== Organization overview ==
OneBlood serves the Southeastern United States and is based in Orlando, Florida. With locations in the states of Alabama, Florida, Georgia, North Carolina, and South Carolina, the organization services over 350 hospitals. It is the second-largest not-for-profit independent blood center in the United States. Designated as a 501(c)(3) organization, the organization has regional offices in the Florida cities of Ft. Lauderdale, Orlando, St. Petersburg, and Tallahassee. Cliff Numark has served as OneBlood's CEO since November 2025, when he succeeded George "Bud" Scholl, who announced his retirement earlier that year. Prior to Scholl, Don Doddridge served as the organization's CEO.

=== Donations ===
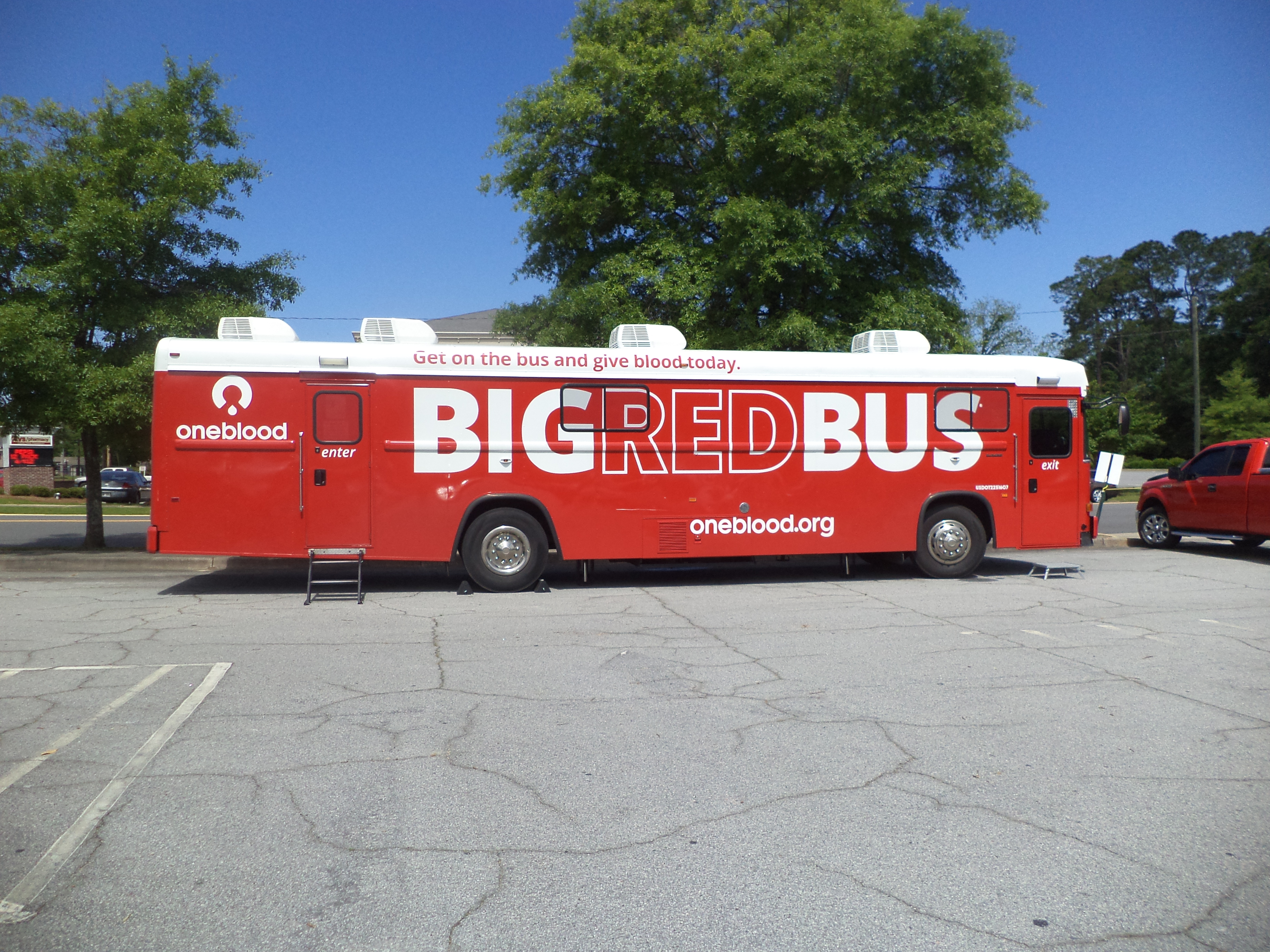
A Big Red Bus in Tifton, Georgia

OneBlood relies entirely on voluntary, unpaid donations from the public, primarily accumulated via their "Big Red Bus". These mobile blood drives are staged at the location of the event's sponsor, which have included workplaces, civic buildings, schools, community events, churches and theatres. There are also over 90 donor centers in the Southeastern United States, typically by appointment.

The organization has been noted to seek donors by promoting on social media and uses targeted recruitment via telephone calls and emails. OneBlood accepts blood donations at their donation centers, but also notably operates 250 "Big Red Bus"-branded bloodmobiles. These are mobile donation centers that drive out to community locations such as restaurants, city halls, or animal adoption centers, among others, to attract donors. Prior to the blood draw, donors must pass a medical history review on a tablet computer and be screened for their vitals including blood pressure, pulse, temperature, iron count, and cholesterol.

In addition to collecting whole blood, OneBlood provides specialized automated processes such as apheresis to allow the donor to give a specific component: platelets, red cell plasma, or a double donation of red cells. OneBlood also offers special services such as autologous donation, directed donation, therapeutic phlebotomy, therapeutic apheresis, and plasmapheresis.

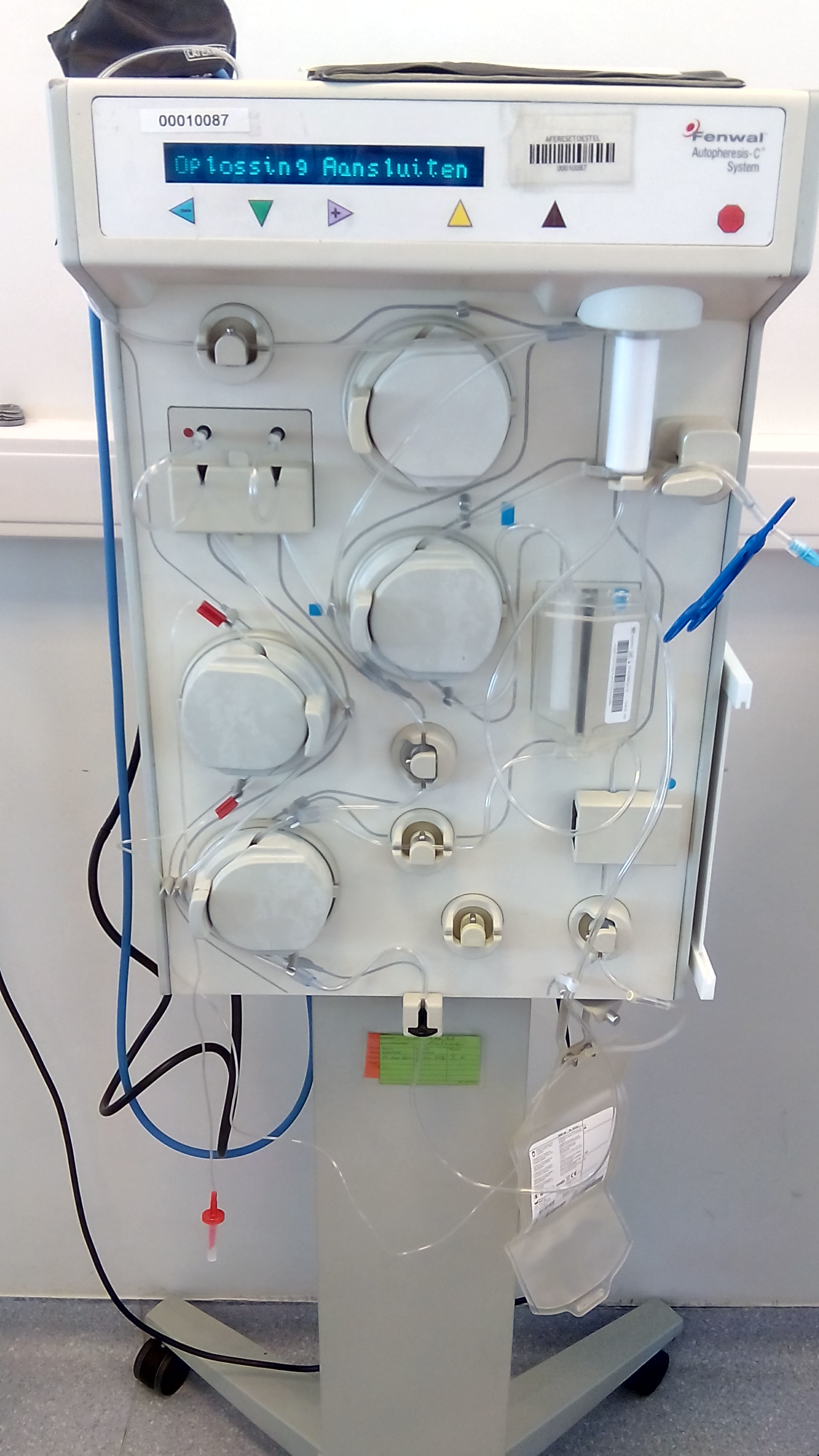
A Plasmapheresis machine

Donors receive items such as coupons, e-gift cards, movie tickets, or OneBlood-branded accessories and apparel. Donors may access their information on the OneBlood donor portal. Once logged in, appointments can be scheduled or changed, health history from prior donations can be viewed, see challenges and earn Challenge eGift Cards, redeem eGift Cards and track donation history.

== History ==
=== Founding ===
OneBlood was formed in January 2012, as a result of merger of three independent Florida blood centers: Florida Blood Services, Florida's Blood Centers, and Community Blood Centers of Florida. Florida Blood Services included Polk County's BloodNet USA.

Upon the formation of OneBlood, the organization supplied 80% of the blood in Florida, becoming the largest blood bank in Florida's history. Some local organizations initially remained independent, such as the Winter Haven Hospital Community Blood Center in Winter Haven. There was also pushback to the merger, including from the Suncoast Communities Blood Bank (SCBB) in the Sarasota area, which was fearful OneBlood "would create a monopoly and result in higher costs for blood", arguing the merger would "siphon off donors" and force them to buy some blood from a national exchange. OneBlood's chairman Rick Walsh disagreed with the notion that the merger would increase prices, arguing it would allow for centers to operate more efficiently. Attorney General of Florida Pam Bondi allowed the merger to go through, creating the $360 million network. In 2013, the Sarasota Herald-Tribune wrote that by mutual agreement between OneBlood and SCBB, the former did not use its marketing budget to "pick off" Sarasota donors.

=== Criticism of executive compensation ===
OneBlood faced scrutiny following an investigation by the Orlando Sentinel in 2012, which found Scholl and other executives charged limousine rides, expensive meals, and alcohol to the non-profit. The Orlando-based Florida's Blood Centers (FBC) previously faced local criticism for excessive executive salaries; the Orlando Sentinel reported that in 2011, FBC's chief executive Anne Chinoda received a raise bringing her annual salary to $605,000, just two months prior to FBC laying off 42 employees. The merger into OneBlood was "touted as a way to save money by streamlining operations".

CEO Don Doddridge received almost $2 million in compensation for 2013, triple the salary of Chinoda who resigned in 2011. His $480,000 salary was supplemented by a one-time $1.5 million payout that funded his pension-plan. In 2013, the salary of the CEOs at the other two Florida blood banks were $321,000 and $133,000. Doddridge retired in mid-2017. Ken Berger, a nonprofit consultant and former operator of Charity Navigator, called Doddridge's compensation "atypical" and "exceptionally high". Berger also likened the OneBlood pay scale to one of a for-profit private business. In response, the chairman of OneBlood's compensation committee, John "Buz" Windham, stated "the board feels that it has appropriately provided for [Doddrige's] long-term financial security." Scholl, who succeeded Doddridge, was compensated $1.77 million in 2024 according to OneBlood's IRS filings.

=== Merger with The Blood Alliance ===
Once having 21 community blood banks, by 2013, the state of Florida had just three. In 2015, OneBlood merged with one of these three: The Blood Alliance, a Jacksonville-based operation that was established in 1942 as the Jacksonville Blood Bank. At the time, OneBlood's service areas in Florida included Tampa Bay, Pensacola, Tallahassee, as well as the state's South, Southeast, and Central regions, and parts of the Southwest region; the organization was also operating in Southern Georgia and Alabama. The Blood Alliance's service areas did not overlap, as they included Jacksonville, Southeast Georgia, and parts of South Carolina. Talks of the two merging began two years prior and once agreed upon, the two organizations re-branded all locations under the OneBlood name. At the time, OneBlood operated 70 donor centers and 200 bloodmobiles, with their blood and related products being distributed to over 210 hospitals. The merger brought in 12 bloodmobiles that the Blood Alliance operated, as well as over 40 hospitals and medical agencies that they were distributing blood to. After the merger, 90% of Florida's blood donation needs were served by OneBlood, with only Sarasota (served by SunCoast) and the Gainesville and Lake City areas (served by LifeSouth) outside of the organization's service area. OneBlood has since however, opened a center in Gainesville in 2023, and operates a center in Venice, Sarasota County. They have also conducted blood drives in Sarasota, including one partnership with the Baltimore Orioles.

=== Pulse nightclub shooting ===
Following the Orlando Pulse nightclub shooting in 2016, many health officials implored community members to donate blood to help those injured in the shooting. Hundreds of people lined up to donate blood to help those injured in the shooting. The day after the shooting, over 200 students lined up at the Big Red Bus that was on the campus of University of Central Florida (UCF). Overwhelmed by the amount of donors, the bus had to turn away around 120 of them. The LGBTQ community initially appeared to be the target of the shooting, though many gay and bisexual men were unable to donate blood due to federal regulations prohibiting men who have had sex with men in the prior year from donating. OneBlood issued a tweet disputing reports that they were allowing gay and bisexual men to donate, stating that all Food and Drug Administration (FDA) guidelines were still being followed. Rodolfo Ayala-Ayala, a lab supervisor employed by the organization was killed in the shooting. The perpetrator of the shooting was confirmed by OneBlood to have donated blood at a mobile blood drive in Ft. Pierce, Florida less than two weeks before the shooting.

In 2024, OneBlood held a "Remembrance Day" blood drive in Orlando for the 49 victims of the shooting.

=== COVID-19 pandemic ===
In 2020, various organizations partnered with or promoted OneBlood, and blood donations in general, in the wake of the COVID-19 pandemic. In Florida, the pandemic caused unprecedented cancellations of blood drives, prompting the South Florida Region of the American Red Cross to partner with OneBlood to help prevent blood shortages during the outbreak. Similarly, the Atrium Health network's facilities in the greater Charlotte area also partnered with OneBlood during the pandemic. Deborah German, the dean of the UCF College of Medicine also promoted information published by OneBlood regarding the donation of convalescent plasma, or blood plasma collected from those who recovered from COVID-19.

=== 2024 ransomware attack ===
In July 2024, the organization was affected by a data breach and ransomware attack that impacted its ability to ship blood products to hundreds of hospitals in Florida. As a result, OneBlood had to manually label products to remain operational. OneBlood did not disclose whether donors' personal information, medical history, or other data was exposed in the attack. The attack happened just as Hurricane Debby (then a tropical storm) threatened the state. In response to the attack, other blood centers in the United States, as well as a national disaster task force sent blood and platelets to OneBlood to help with their supply. A class action lawsuit was filed alleging that OneBlood failed to implement proper security controls that could have prevented the breach; while denying any wrongdoing, the organization agreed to settle the lawsuit for $1 million.

== See also ==
- List of blood donation agencies in the United States
