= One Blood =

One Blood may refer to:

- Una Sangre/One Blood Lila Downs album 2004, One Blood Tour
- One Blood, reggae band Barry Boom
- One Blood (Yothu Yindi album), an album by Yothu Yindi
- It's Okay (One Blood), a song by American rapper The Game
- One Milkali (One Blood), a song by Australian duo Electric Fields
- OneBlood, an American not-for-profit organization
