= BERC (disambiguation) =

BERC may refer to:

== Governmental entities ==
- Basque Excellence Research Centres, type of research centres supported by the Basque government
- Bangladesh Energy Regulatory Commission, an independent agency for energy regulation in Bangladesh

== Medicine ==
- Blood Emergency Readiness Corps, a consortium of community-based blood reserves in the United States
