= Memorial Blood Centers =

American blood bank

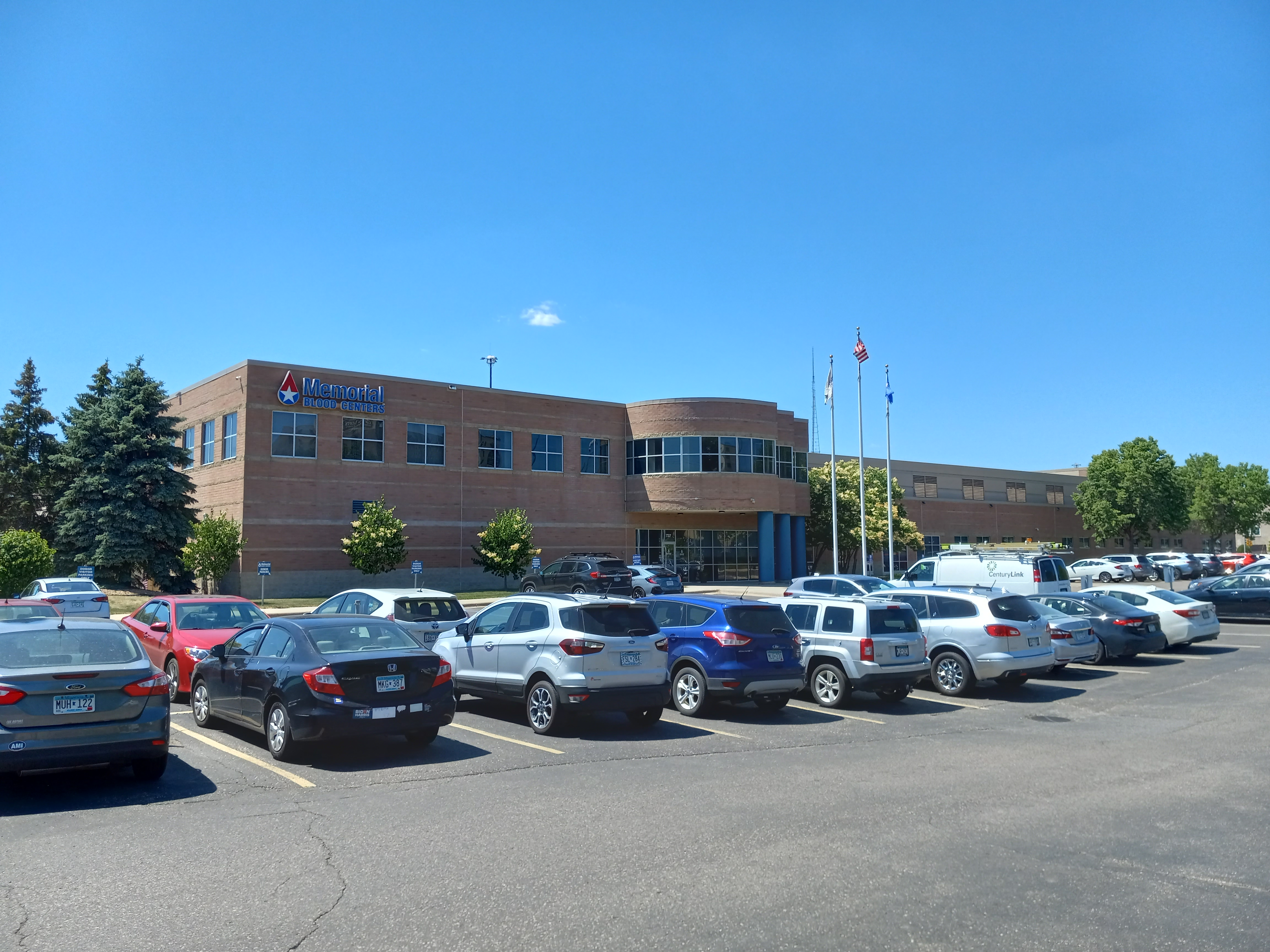

- Location within Minnesota
- Founded: 1948
- Type: blood bank
- Location: Minnesota, United States
- Coordinates: 44°57′49″N 93°12′04″W
- Website: www.mbc.org/Home

Memorial Blood Centers is a blood bank in Minnesota, United States. It is a division of Innovative Blood Resources (IBR), and supplies blood to hospitals and clinic partners, national blood centers, biotechnology companies, research institutions, in the US and abroad.

The blood bank is a member of America's Blood Centers, the Minnesota Hospital Association (MHA), American Association of Blood Banks (AABB), and Blood Centers of America. It is not affiliated with the American Red Cross. IBR was formed in 2010 as a merger of Memorial Blood Centers and Nebraska Community Blood Bank to mitigate the increasing costs of blood collection and testing. It formed a strategic partnership with New York Blood Center (NYBC) in 2016 to give them access to blood donors in the Midwestern United States.

== History ==
Formed in 1948, as War Memorial Blood Bank, the name was changed in 1985 to Memorial Blood Centers. In 1992, the Minnesota Supreme Court reviewed the case of testing blood by donors when a woman was infected with HIV because she received two units of packed red blood cells. The two units of blood were sent by Red Cross to Memorial under terms of a reciprocal blood-sharing agreement. Memorial stored the blood until it was sold to Fairview Southdale Hospital for the woman's transfusion.

In 2000, additional donor centers opened in Hibbing, Coon Rapids, Virginia, Eden Prairie, and Bloomington. MBC moved to a new headquarters in St. Paul, with new laboratory facilities to provide infectious disease testing and transfusion consultation, participating in the rare blood types donor program, and providing families and organizations with parentage testing and medical testing services for immigration to the United States.

MBC was named Associate Member of the Year in 2007 by the Minnesota Hospital Association (MHA), and was among the first group of blood centers in the nation to implement ISBT 128, an internationally standardized blood product labeling system designed to improve quality and safety. Blood donations surpassed 125,000 in 2008 and increased 20% from 2006 to 2009. MBC also received the 2008 Minnesota Quality Award.

In August, 2007 the I-35W Mississippi River bridge in Minnesota collapsed, and MBC supplied blood to the nearest hospital, Hennepin County Medical Center. As a result of 72 hours of continuous national publicity, MBC received over 11,000 phone calls in the two days following the disaster. The usual collection of about 400 units/day was doubled to almost 800 units and on the second day after the disaster (August 3, 2007) the blood center issued press releases stating that the immediate needs had been met.

In December 2007, a laptop was stolen containing MBC donor's personal information, resulting in a data breach affecting 268,000 MBC blood donors The laptop included US Social Security numbers, which MBC had been using to verify that donors were eligible to donate blood. Following the theft, Memorial stopped using Social Security numbers to identify donors.

In 2008, the Minnesota Twins and Memorial Blood Centers created "First Responder's Day".

In 2010, MBC received the Minnesota Quality Award. In 2012, MBC merged with Nebraska Community Blood Bank. In 2014, Memorial Blood Centers began providing blood type O negative red blood cells to air ambulances. It began screening for babesia in 2015 and zika in 2016.

In 2015, Donald C. Berglund, CEO was compensated $342,201 salary plus $112,297 for a total compensation package of $454,498. Dr. Jed Gorlin, medical director, received a salary of $378,685 and $78,911 to total $457,596. This surpasses the $150,000 median non-profit organization salary in the Twin Cities by 205%.

== Laboratory services ==
MBC conducts medical research at the Pelham Boulevard office in St. Paul, and develops blood products which are tested and processed.

MBC works with Be the Match, the National Marrow Donor Program to provide collection, processing, cryopreservation, storage and infusion support services.

MBC staff also provide continuing education and transfusion support consultancy.
