= UF Health St. Johns =

- University of Florida Health

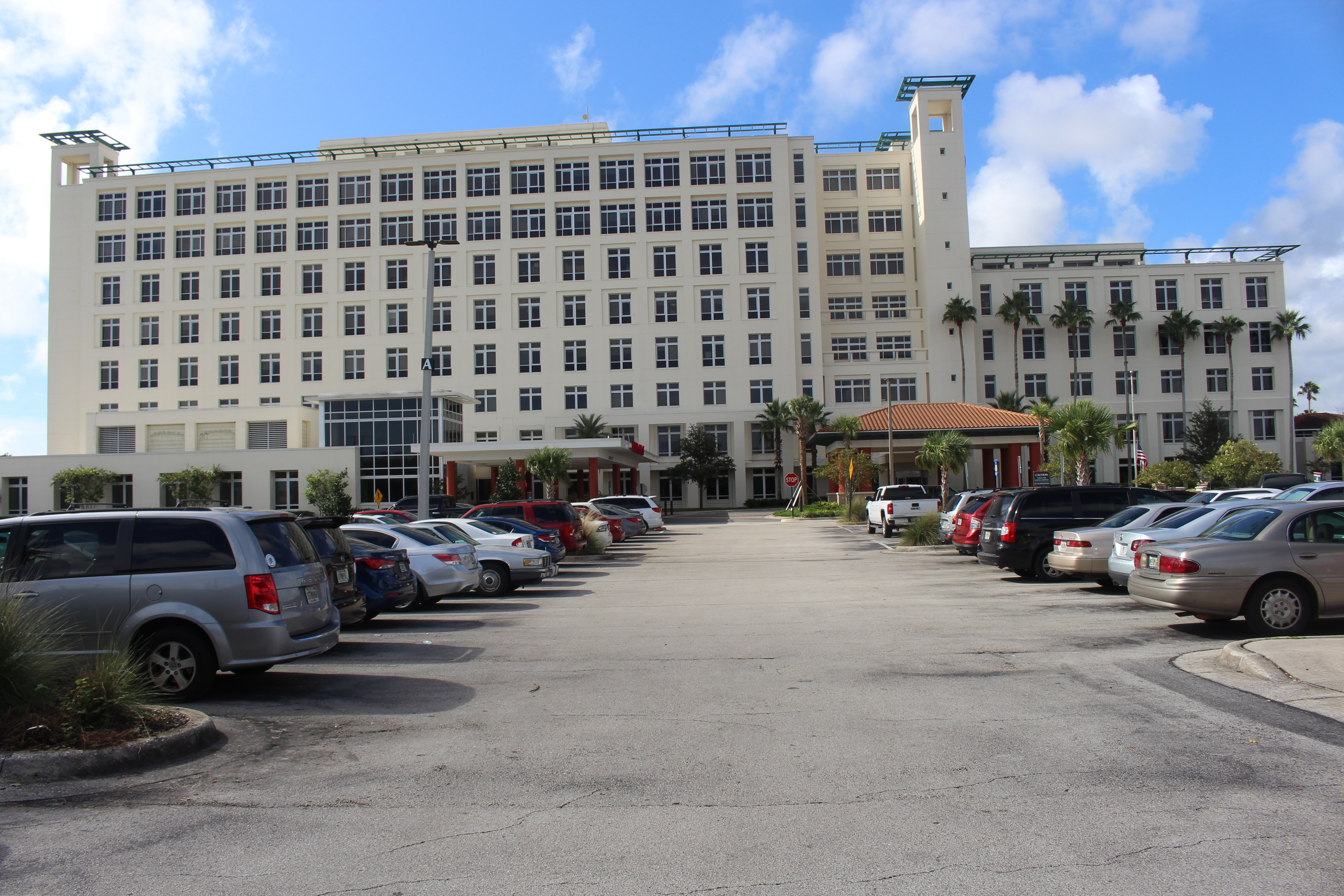

Geography
- Location: 400 Health Park Boulevard, St. Augustine, Florida, United States
- Coordinates: 29.863144°N 81.317604°W

Organization
- Care system: Medicare/Medicaid/Public
- Type: General medical and surgical
- Affiliated university: University of Florida Health

Services
- Emergency department: yes
- Beds: 335

History
- Founded: as Alicia Hospital on March 1, 1890

Links
- Website: www.flaglerhospital.org
- Lists: Hospitals in Florida

UF Health St. Johns is a medical system of the University of Florida established in 1889. Primarily located in unincorporated St. Johns County, Florida (with a St. Augustine address), the organization offers "Centers of Excellence" in bariatrics, heart, cancer, maternity, orthopedics and sinus. On September 13, 2023, University of Florida Health announced that it had closed on the acquisition of the Flagler Health+ system and Flagler Hospital would be renamed UF Health Flagler Hospital.

== History ==
=== Alicia Hospital ===
In the 1880s, there was no public hospital between Daytona Beach and Jacksonville. Dr. Sloggett purchased a house on Marine Street for his home in 1884, but his goal was to eventually transform the structure into a hospital.

The children of the St. Augustine Loyal Temperance held a fair at the Union chapel on April 7, 1888. Their intent was to raise money for a hospital in St. Augustine. Winter resident Henry Flagler became interested in the issue. On May 22, 1888, he invited St. Augustine's most influential women to his Ponce de León Hotel and offered them a hospital if the community would commit to operate and manage the facility. The ladies accepted his offer, then began soliciting contributions and organizing fund-raisers. Dr. Andrew Anderson was named chairman of the board of trustees in 1889. Flagler purchased and deeded the property and building on Marine Street to the St. Augustine Hospital Association, and the facility opened March 1, 1890 as a non-profit institution, serving whites only (some hospitals in Florida were not fully integrated until the 1970s). Physician and St. Augustine mayor DeWitt Webb also practiced there.

In 1905, the name of the facility was changed to "Flagler Hospital" in honor of their first benefactor.

=== Flagler Hospital ===
A training school for nurses was started in 1913.

A 1916 fire destroyed many of the hospital's structures. Nearby local residents took the patients into their homes until they could be placed elsewhere. The hospital association began making plans for a new structure, but nearly five years passed before it became reality. Henry Flagler died in 1913; his third wife, Mary Lily Kenan Flagler, donated money to construct a brick structure with three floors which was dedicated January 5, 1921.

During the 1930s, hospital admissions averaged between 60 and 70 admissions each month. A new Florida law was passed in 1932 which required that medical training schools be associated with multiple hospitals, so the nurses training program was discontinued after nearly 20 years.

During World War II, there was a big increase in admissions, with almost 40 births per month. The hospital was forced to raise prices to pay for higher supply costs.

The future looked bright in the 1950s. To meet the increasing demand for healthcare, the hospital's south wing was renovated, providing room for a clinic and doctor offices. A modern laboratory was built, as were hydrotherapy and physiotherapy rooms.

The Florida East Coast Railway Hospital was founded in St. Augustine in 1891 to care for Florida East Coast Railway employees and family members. In the early 1960s, that hospital announced that they would be closing, which provided Flagler Hospital time to prepare for more patients. Flagler Hospital built a West wing and remodeled its existing facility.

Medical specialists were drawn to the area during the 70s, and the Anderson-Gibbs Annex was built to accommodate their needs. The hospital was expanded to provide more surgical capacity and an in-house psychiatric services center was established to serve the area. Demand for cardiac services prompted the trustees to develop a cardiac care program in 1979. Pulmonary diagnostic procedures came next.

The St. Johns County population exceeded 50,000 during the 1980s, and the Marine street facility was no longer adequate. Planning began for a new health park on a more accessible 75-acre parcel along the east side of U.S. Highway 1. The move to the new location was completed in 1989. Two years later, Flagler merged with St. Augustine General Hospital, doubling the number of patient beds from 150 to over 300.

In November 2005, Flagler sold its Community Home Health unit, which provides home visits by a nurse, to Almost Family, Inc.

Prior to the Great Recession, the hospital announced plans to build a $30 million medical park at the World Commerce Center. Twelve acres were purchased for $2 million in early 2005, and the project was to be built in stages over two years. Phase I was a 10,000 ft^{2} urgent care center costing $5 million, followed by phase II, a 3,400 ft^{2} condominium building of doctor's offices. The final element was to be a 43,000 ft^{2} ambulatory surgery center. As of 2011, the project was still on hold.

Flagler Hospital expanded to become Flagler Health+ in 2019.

=== Flagler Health+ ===
The hospital, now as a health system, began a campaign to expand its services in the early 2020s. The hospital developed a partnership with First Coast YMCA to develop new branches as part of its health centers.

In 2021, Flagler Health+ purchased land in northern St. Johns County and Palm Coast to develop new hospitals.

The health system announced in 2022 that it would seek to join another health system in order to expand services and increase investment. On February 2, 2023, University of Florida Health was announced as the chosen partner. After an agreement was reached in May 2023, the acquisition closed on September 3 of that year, upon which Flagler Hospital was renamed UF Health Flagler Hospital and the Flagler Health+ system renamed UF Health St. Johns.

== Today ==
=== Specialties ===
The hospital has a 14-bed nursing home unit that was rated above average on October 5, 2010, from CMS of the Department of Health and Human Services.

Flagler has centers of excellence in Imaging, Bariatrics, Cancer, Heart, Spine, Maternity, Orthopedics and Sinus.

=== Hospice ===
The Bailey Family Center for Caring was opened on January 8, 2011, on the Flagler Hospital campus. The 12-bed, 11,700-square-foot (1,090 m^{2}) facility is the first inpatient hospice center in St. Johns County, Florida and the fifth for Community Hospice of Northeast Florida.

=== Blood bank ===
Flagler Hospital was the primary user of services from the St. Johns County Blood Bank. In 1988, they partnered to construct a 4,000-square-foot (370 m^{2}) facility on the Flagler Hospital campus. They merged with Jacksonville's Florida Georgia Blood Alliance on February 20, 2005. The resulting Blood Alliance at Flagler Hospital reduced costs and increased the use of technology while continuing to provide blood service to Flagler Hospital.

== Honors ==
- Included on list of America's Best Hospitals in 2007 by U.S. News & World Report.
- Outstanding Achievement Award in 2008 from the Commission on Cancer.
- Gold Seal of Approval and Primary Stroke Care Center Designation by the Joint Commission.
- Accredited by the Commission on Cancer of the American College of Surgeons.
- Named a Bariatric Surgery Center of Excellence by the American Society of Metabolic and Bariatric Surgery.
- Accredited by American Academy of Sleep Medicine.
- Certified by the American Association of Cardiovascular and Pulmonary Rehabilitation.
- Identified as north Florida's first Magnet hospital by the American Nurses Credentialing Center.
- Named by HealthGrades as one of America's Best 50 Hospitals in 2011.
- Distinguished Hospital and Patient Safety Excellence Award from HealthGrades for seven consecutive years.
- Named a "Best place to work in northeast Florida" by the Jacksonville Business Journal.
- One of Solucient's (now Thomson Reuters) "100 most improved Hospitals" for 2005, 2006, 2007, and 2008.
