= Community Blood Services of Illinois =

ImpactLife, formerly Community Blood Services of Illinois, is a blood center located in Urbana, Illinois.

ImpactLife provides lifesaving blood products to more than 123 hospitals in a four-state region. Headquartered in Davenport, Iowa, with distribution hubs and donor centers in Iowa, Illinois, Missouri, and Wisconsin.

In addition to its headquarters, ImpactLife has regional distribution hubs in central Illinois (Peoria, Illinois and Springfield, Illinois), eastern Illinois (Urbana, Illinois); southeastern Iowa (Ottumwa, Iowa), the St. Louis region (Earth City, Missouri) and southern Wisconsin (Madison, Wisconsin).

ImpactLife collects blood at 19 fixed site donor centers and at more than 5,000 mobile blood drives held each year.

ImpactLife is licensed and regulated by the U.S. Food and Drug Administration and holds membership in America's Blood Centers, the American Association of Blood Banks and participate in the National Marrow Donor Program.
