= Florida Georgia Blood Alliance =

American blood bank

The Florida Georgia Blood Alliance (FGBA) was non-profit community blood bank that supplies blood to northeast Florida and southeast Georgia. The alliance began in Jacksonville, Florida, in 1942 under the name of the Jacksonville Blood Bank. In the 1980s, it expanded to include southeast Georgia, becoming the Florida Georgia Blood Alliance in the process. In 2001, it began serving the Memorial Health University Medical Center in Savannah, Georgia, and opened a Community Donor Center. It also served the Low Country area of South Carolina as The Blood Alliance.

The St. Johns County Blood Bank merged with FGBA on February 20, 2005. The resulting Blood Alliance at Flagler Hospital reduced processing costs and increased the use of technology while continuing to provide blood service to Flagler Hospital.

In 2015, The Blood Alliance merged with OneBlood, and has since operated under the OneBlood name.

== See also ==
- Blood donation
