= 2025 Pembroke bus crash =

Bus accident in New York, U.S.

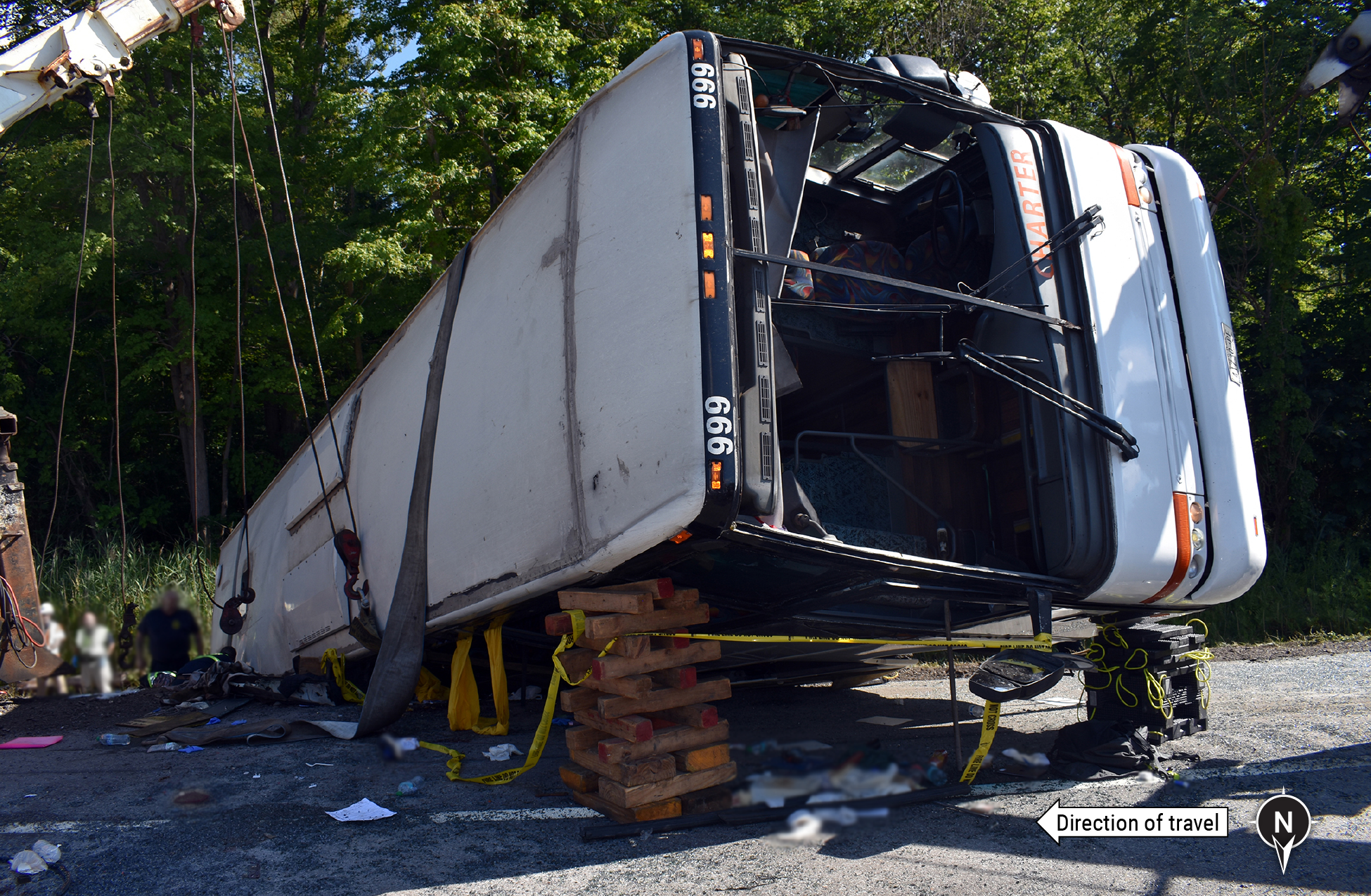
- Cranes trying to stabilize the bus

Details
- Date: August 22, 2025 c.12:20 p.m.
- Location: Interstate 90 in New York, Pembroke, New York
- Coordinates: 42°59′22″N 78°26′48″W
- Country: United States
- Operator: M & Y Tours
- Incident type: Rollover crash
- Cause: Loss of control

Statistics
- Bus: 1
- Passengers: 53
- Crew: 1
- Deaths: 5
- Injured: 49
- Damage: Bus written off

On August 22, 2025, a tour bus crashed and rolled onto its side on the Interstate 90 in New York in Pembroke, New York, United States, killing five people and injuring 49 others. Tourists from China, India, the Philippines and the Middle East were among the victims.

== Background ==
=== Vehicle ===
The bus, owned by M&Y Tour Inc. out of Staten Island, had no mechanical issues.

== Crash ==
At about 12:20 p.m. EDT, the bus was travelling east on the New York State Thruway near Pembroke, Genesee County, coming back from a trip to Niagara Falls. It departed the travel lanes onto the right shoulder before continuing left across both eastbound travel lanes, entered the vegetated center median, reentered the eastbound travel lanes, yawed counterclockwise and rolled onto its right side. The bus came to rest with its front end on the shoulder and edge of the eastbound roadway, about a quarter mile east of mile marker 404.0. Some passengers became trapped or were ejected, as most weren't wearing seatbelts. Air medical services were deployed to the scene. After the crash, all lanes on Interstate 90 were closed and travelers were told by police to expect delays.

== Victims ==
The victims were identified as 65-year-old Shankar Kumar Jha from India, 60-year-old Pinki Changrani from East Brunswick, New Jersey, 22-year-old Xie Hongzhuo from Beijing, China and 55-year-old Zhang Xiaolan and 56-year-old Jian Mingli, both from Jersey City. Police initially said a child was among the deceased, but later retracted the statement, however, several children were among the injured. 48 passengers and the driver were injured, of which 21 were hospitalized. A mass casualty incident was declared.

== Investigation ==
A grand jury indicted the bus driver, 56-year-old Bin Shao of Flushing, Queens, on five counts of manslaughter in the second degree and five counts of criminally negligent homicide. He appeared in court on February 13 and remained held on $100,000 bail. He pleaded not guilty to the charges. No evidence of drug or alcohol impairment was found. Politician Bruce Blakeman said tighter commercial driver's license restrictions may have prevented the crash. The crash sparked calls for a full audit of New York's commercial driver licensing system. On July 6, 2026, Bin Shao pleaded guilty to five counts of criminally negligent homicide after admitting to attempting to reach for a water bottle and becoming distracted. Sentencing is scheduled for September 9, 2026.
