= Vitalant =

Nonprofit blood bank

- Formation: 1943; 83 years ago
- Founded at: Phoenix, Arizona
- Type: Nonprofit organization
- Tax ID no.: 86-0098929
- Legal status: 501(c)(3) organization
- Headquarters: Scottsdale, Arizona
- Region served: United States
- Chief Executive Officer: David R. Green
- President, Chief Operating Officer: Rob Van Tuyle
- President: Katie Cobb
- Revenue: US$739,592,382 (2024)
- Expenses: US$738,892,381 (2024)
- Website: www.vitalant.org
- Formerly called: Blood Systems Inc.

Vitalant (formerly Blood Systems Inc.) is a nonprofit organization that collects blood from volunteer donors and provides blood, blood products and services across the United States. It was founded in 1943 as the Salt River Valley Blood Bank in Phoenix, Arizona.

Vitalant is the nation’s largest independent, nonprofit blood services provider exclusively focused on providing blood and comprehensive transfusion medicine services. The organization comprises a network of about 120 donation centers across the U.S. and are the sole blood provider to about 900 hospitals across the United States.

Vitalant is a founding member of the Association for the Advancement of Blood & Biotherapies (formerly known as the American Association of Blood Banks) and was involved in the creation of the America's Blood Centers consortium of nonprofit blood centers.

The Vitalant Research Institute (formerly Blood Systems Research Institute) is housed in San Francisco with a second campus in Denver. VRI is supported by grants from the National Institute of Health and has collaborative partnerships with major universities and medical centers such as the University of California, San Francisco, University of Southern California, Children's National Medical Center, Emory University, Johns Hopkins University, Cornell University, University of Pittsburgh, Children’s Medical Center, Oakland, U.S. Department of Veteran Affairs, University of Massachusetts Medical School, Massachusetts General Hospital and Harvard Medical School Partners AIDS Research Center.

== Organizational history ==
The main blood bank that became United Blood Services was founded in 1943 as the Salt River Valley Blood Bank in Phoenix, Arizona, by Opal Davis and Kitty Baldwin. Not long after its creation, parent company Blood Systems, Inc., was formed. Other blood banks that later became part of Blood Systems were founded in this same time period, including Blood Centers of the Pacific—whose predecessor, the Irwin Memorial Blood Bank, was founded in 1941 as the first community blood bank in the United States—and the Inland Northwest Blood Center (1945). Blood Systems was the first interstate blood bank, operating under multiple names; by 1967, it served 850 hospitals in 12 states. The youngest predecessor to Vitalant, LifeSource, was created in 1987 by the merger of the Blood Center of Northern Illinois with operations of the American Red Cross in the Chicago area. The company grew through mergers with other blood centers.

On September 24, 2018, Blood Systems merged all of its existing brands under the Vitalant name. These included Lifeblood, Blood Centers of the Pacific, BloodSource, Bonfils Blood Center, Central Blood Bank, Community Blood Services, Inland Northwest Blood Center, LifeShare, LifeSource, and United Blood Services.

== See also ==
- Blood bank
- Lizzie's Loot, a Tucson, Arizona based charity organization that organizes blood drives and other fundraisers
