= Carter BloodCare =

American nonprofit organization in Texas

Carter BloodCare is a 501(c)(3) nonprofit organization headquartered in Bedford, Texas. Carter BloodCare currently provides more than 440,000 blood products annually to over 200 hospitals serving patients in more than 50 counties across North, Central and East Texas. One of the largest blood centers in operation in the United States, Carter BloodCare’s mission is “we save lives by making transfusion possible.”.

The organization is accredited by AABB (formerly the American Association of Blood Banks), and the Foundation for the Accreditation of Cellular Therapy (FACT); licensed by the Food and Drug Administration; and holds membership in the South Central Association of Blood Banks (SCABB), America's Blood Centers (ABC), Blood Centers of America (BCA), and the Alliance for Community Transfusion Services (ACTS).

As of September 2024, Barbara Bryant serves as a Carter BloodCare chief executive officer. Bryant previously served as Chief Medical Officer and Executive Vice President at Versiti, a national leader in both blood banking and transfusion medicine research.

== History ==
Carter BloodCare’s story began in 1951 with the founding of the nonprofit J.K. and Susie L. Wadley Research Institute & Blood Bank, serving patients in the Dallas Dallas, Texas area. In 1959, Carter Blood Center was founded to serve patients in the Fort Worth, Texas area. The two blood centers merged in 1998 to better serve the DFW metroplex and became known as Carter BloodCare, headquartered in Bedford, Texas.

In 2001, Carter BloodCare expanded into Central Texas with a location in Waco and, in 2007, merged with Stewart Regional Blood Center, located in Tyler, to serve East Texas.

Carter BloodCare offers services including collection, processing, specialized laboratory testing, storage and distribution of blood and blood components. The nonprofit also offers immunohematology reference laboratory expertise; apheresis services; cellular therapy collections, processing storage and infusion; medical consultation and research.

Carter BloodCare is one of only three AABB IRL accredited labs based in Texas. The nonprofit blood center offers for-profit business opportunities, including simple to complex antibody identification, compatibility testing, antigen negative units, red blood cell genotyping, centralized transfusion services, flow cytometry and specialized platelet matching services. Carter BloodCare also has a FACT-accredited cellular therapy laboratory.American Association of Blood Banks),
