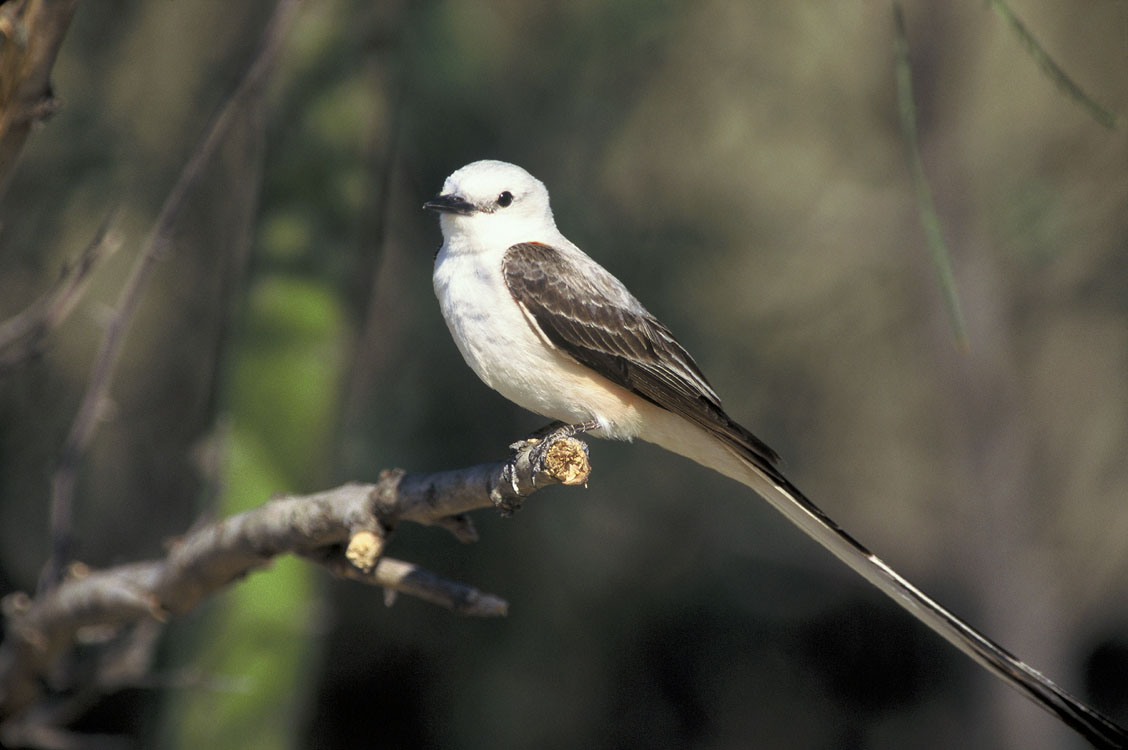

Conservation status
- Least Concern (IUCN 3.1)

Scientific classification
- Kingdom: Animalia
- Phylum: Chordata
- Class: Aves
- Order: Passeriformes
- Family: Tyrannidae
- Genus: Tyrannus
- Species: T. forficatus

Binomial name
- Tyrannus forficatus (Gmelin, JF, 1789)
- Breeding Migration Nonbreeding

Synonyms
- Muscivora forficata

= Scissor-tailed flycatcher =

Species of bird

The scissor-tailed flycatcher (Tyrannus forficatus), known as swallow-tailed flycatcher or scissorstail, is a long-tailed insectivorous bird of the genus Tyrannus, whose members are collectively referred to as kingbirds. It is found in North and Central America, and is the state bird of Oklahoma.

== Taxonomy ==
The scissor-tailed flycatcher was formally described in 1789 by the German naturalist Johann Friedrich Gmelin in his revised and expanded edition of Carl Linnaeus's Systema Naturae. He placed it with the flycatchers in the genus Muscicapa and coined the binomial name Muscicapa forficata. The specific epithet is from Latin forfex, forficis meaning "a pair of scissors". Gmelin based his description on "Le moucherolle à queue fourchue du Mexique" (French: "the Mexican swallow-tailed flycatcher") that had been described in 1778 by the French polymath Comte de Buffon from a specimen from Mexico and illustrated with a hand-coloured engraving by François-Nicolas Martinet.

The scissor-tailed flycatcher is now one of 13 species placed in the kingbird genus Tyrannus that was introduced in 1799 by Bernard Germain de Lacépède. The species is monotypic: no subspecies are recognised. Within the genus Tyrannus, the scissor-tailed flycatcher is most closely related to the western kingbird (Tyrannus verticalis).

=== Hybridization ===
In eastern Arkansas and western Tennessee, there is a hybrid breeding zone where the scissor-tailed flycatcher and the western kingbird are sympatric and possibly compete for the same niche. Both these species have simultaneously expanded their breeding ranges eastward over the past 50 years.

== Distribution and habitat ==
Their breeding habitat is open shrubby country with scattered trees in the south-central states of Texas, Oklahoma, Kansas, western portions of Louisiana, Arkansas, and Missouri west to far eastern New Mexico and northeastern Mexico. Reported sightings record occasional stray visitors as far north as southern Canada and Upstate New York, as far east as Florida and Georgia, and in the West Indies. They migrate through Texas and eastern Mexico to their winter non-breeding range, from southern Mexico to Panama. Pre-migratory roosts and flocks flying south may contain as many as 1000 birds.

== Description ==
Adult birds have pale gray heads and upper parts, light underparts, salmon-pink flanks and undertail coverts, and dark gray wings. Axillars and patch on underwing coverts are red. Their extremely long, forked tails, which are black on top and white on the underside, are characteristic and unmistakable. At maturity, the male may be up to 15 in (38 cm) in length, while the female's tail is up to 30% shorter. The wingspan is 38.1 cm (15.0 in) and the weight is up to 43 g (1.5 oz). Immature birds are duller in color and have shorter tails. A lot of these birds have been reported to be more than 40 cm (16 in).

== Breeding ==
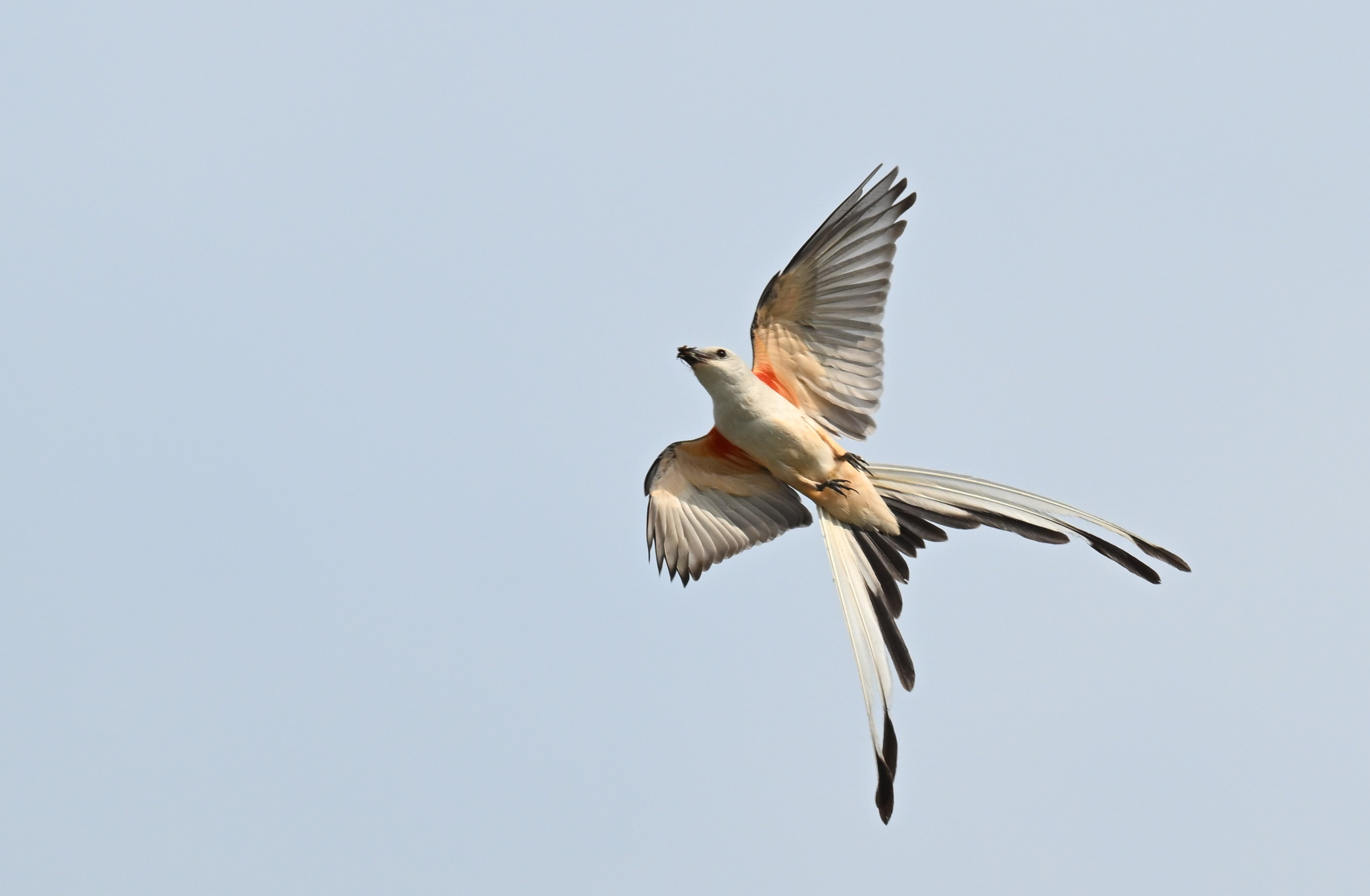
In flight, with prey

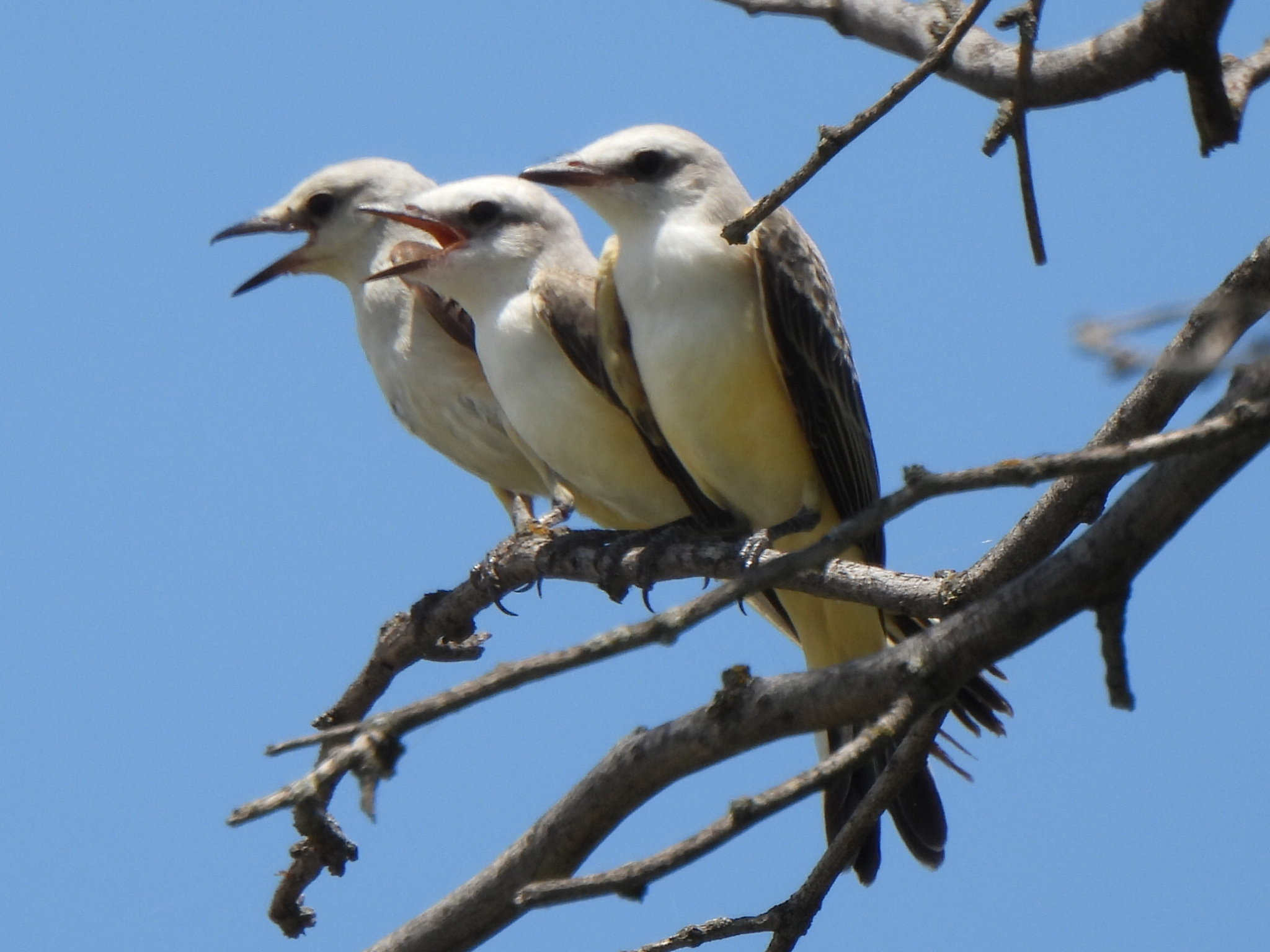
Juveniles, in Texas

They build a cup nest in isolated trees or shrubs, sometimes using artificial sites such as telephone poles near towns. The male performs a spectacular aerial display during courtship with his long tail forks streaming out behind him. Both parents feed the young. Like other kingbirds, they are very aggressive in defending their nest. Clutches contain three to six eggs.

== Diet ==
In the summer, scissor-tailed flycatchers feed mainly on insects (grasshoppers, robber-flies, and dragonflies), which they may catch by waiting on a perch and then flying out to catch them in flight (hawking). For additional food in the winter they will also eat some berries.

== Gallery ==
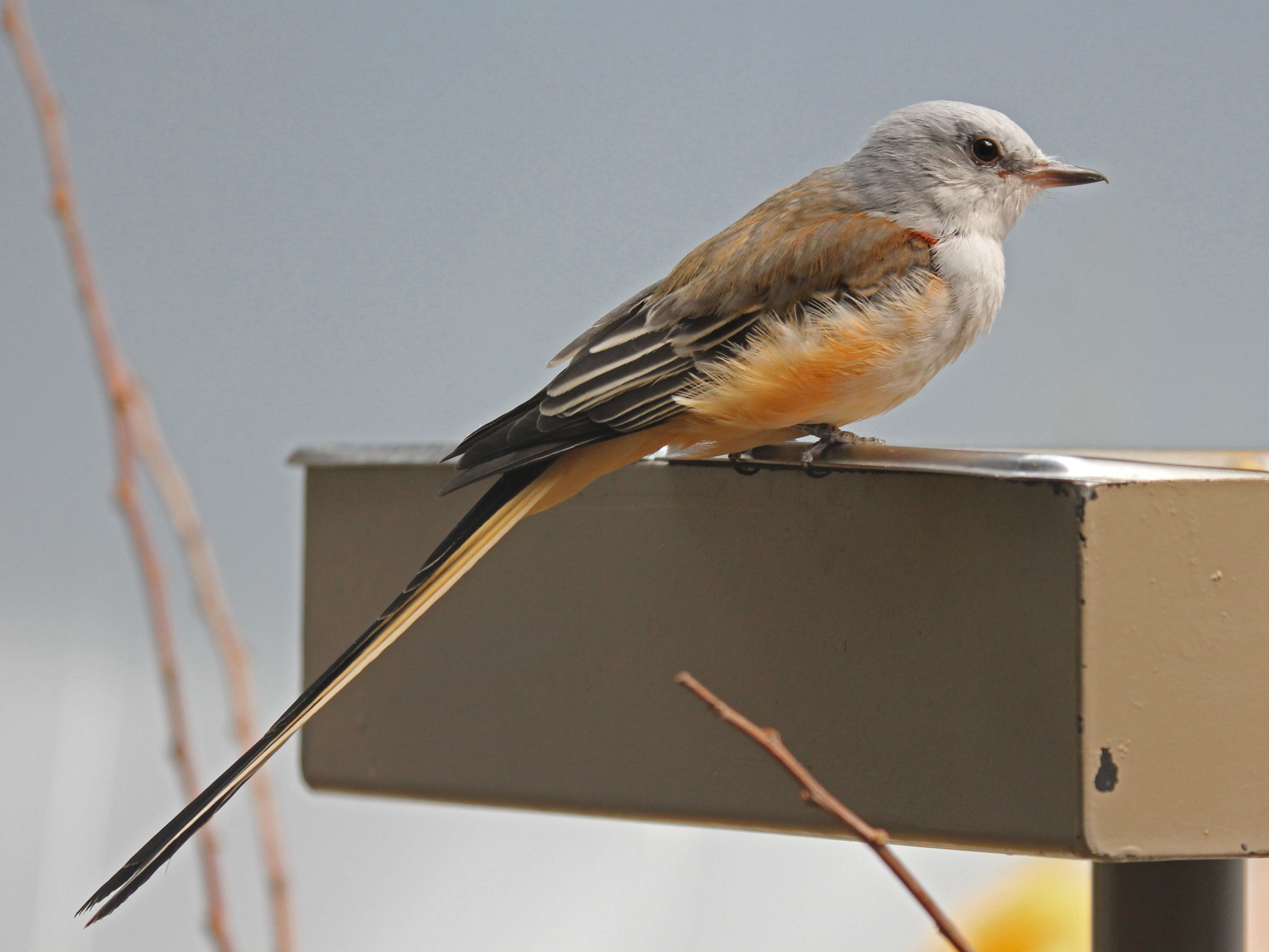
Scissor-tailed flycatcher at the National Aviary in Pittsburgh, Pennsylvania

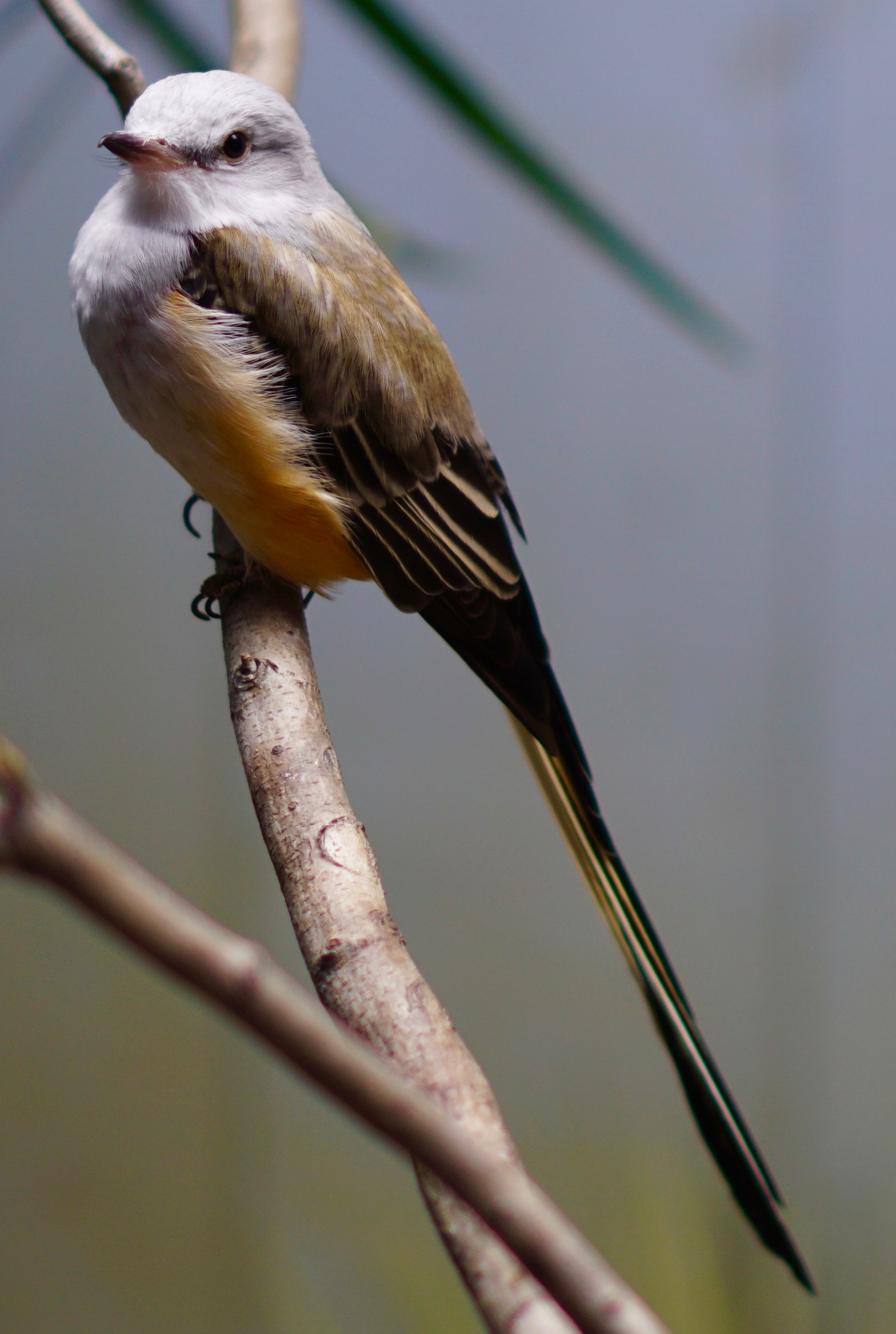
At the National Aviary

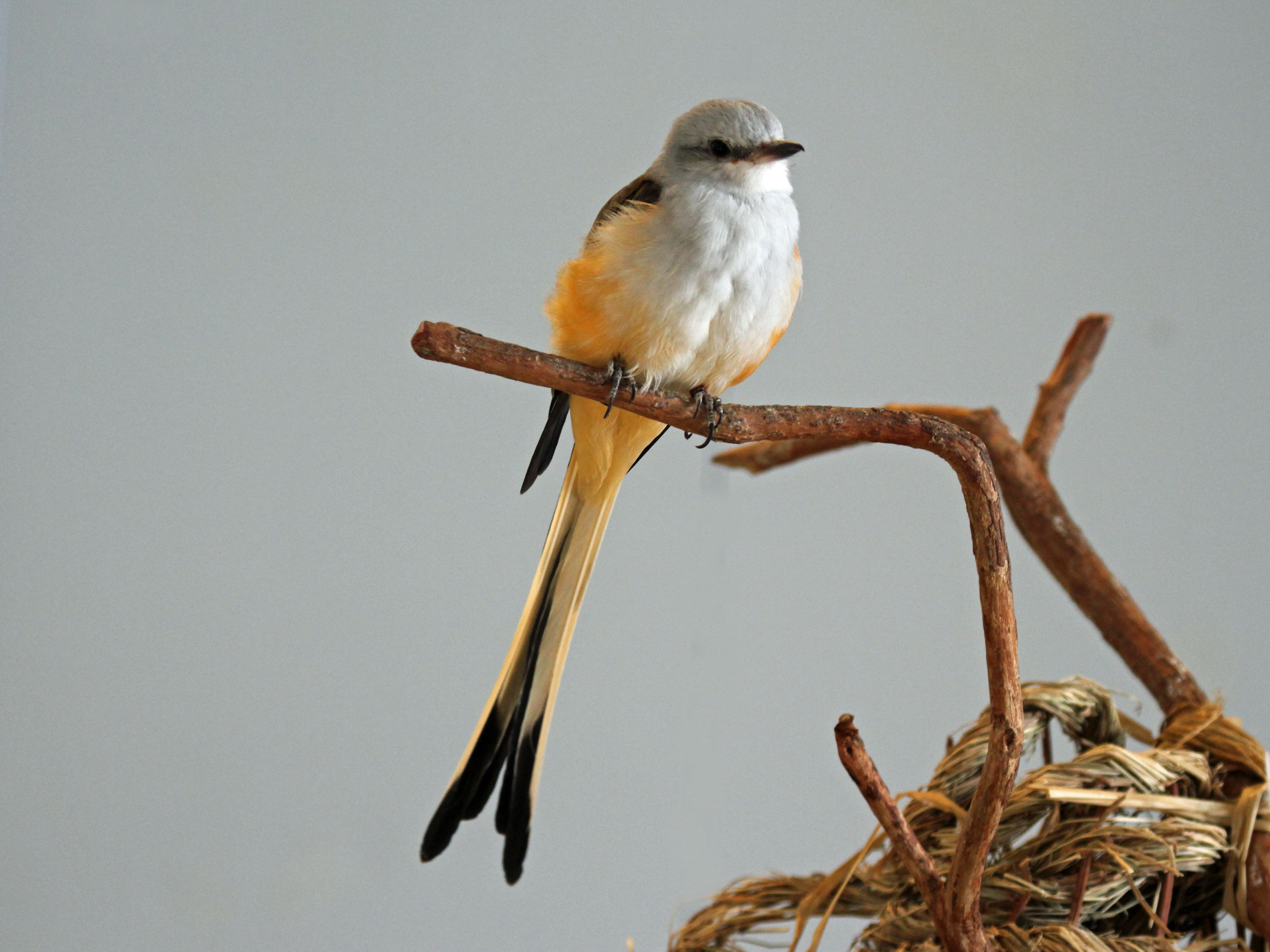
At the National Aviary

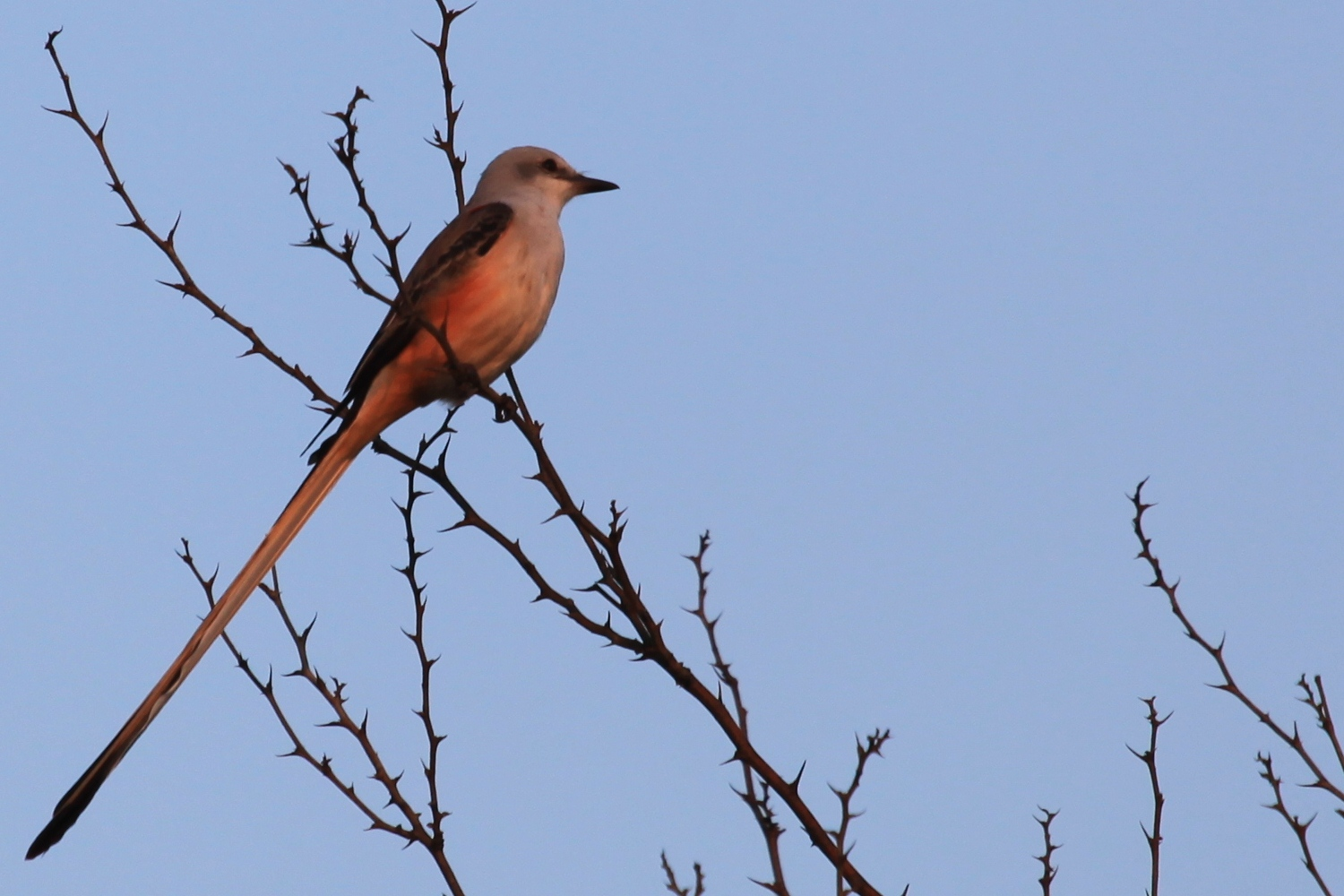
Near Tampico, Mexico
