= Bloodworks Northwest =

American blood bank

- Formation: 1944
- Headquarters: Seattle, Washington
- Chief Executive Officer: Curt Bailey
- Chief Scientific Officer: Dr. Jose Lopez
- Co-Chief Medical Officer: Kirsten Alcorn, Theresa Nester
- Revenue: $152,389,350 (2014)
- Expenses: $155,272,902 (2014)
- Staff: 901 (2020)
- Website: www.bloodworksnw.org
- Formerly called: Puget Sound Blood Center

Bloodworks Northwest is a blood bank and medical research institute headquartered in Seattle, Washington, that serves 90 hospitals in western Washington and Oregon. It has formerly been known as the Puget Sound Blood Center and King County Central Blood Bank.

The organization is accredited by AABB (formerly the American Association of Blood Banks), licensed by the Food and Drug Administration; and holds membership in America's Blood Centers (ABC), Blood Centers of America (BCA), and the Alliance for Community Transfusion Services (ACTS).

== History ==
Bloodworks Northwest was founded in 1944 as the King County Central Blood Bank.

Originally serving hospitals in King County, Washington, King County Central Blood Bank gradually expanded its service area to include Kitsap, Whatcom, Skagit, Mason, Thurston, Jefferson, and Clallam counties. In 1974 it was renamed Puget Sound Blood Center to better reflect its growing geography. In 1991 the reach of Puget Sound Blood Center expanded further when it was merged with the Snohomish-Island Counties Blood Bank. The blood bank rebranded itself again in 2015, adopting the name Bloodworks Northwest.

== Operations ==
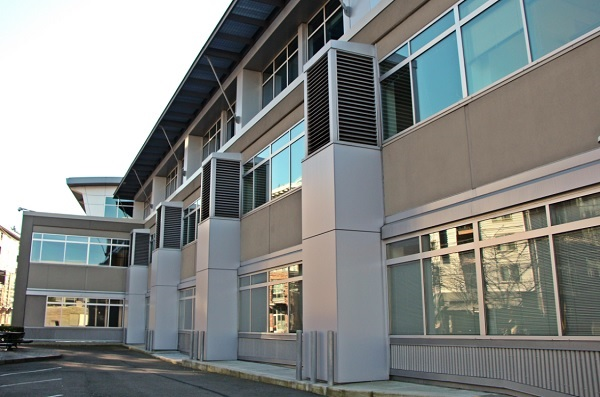
The Bloodworks Northwest Research Institute building pictured in 2015

Bloodworks Northwest operates 12 donation centers in western Washington, as well as mobile donation vehicles. Bloodworks Northwest claims it collects about 900 units of blood each day.

Bloodworks Northwest also partners with western Washington hospitals to collect and preserve umbilical cord blood from new mothers, which are harvested for stem cells used in research and cancer treatment. The cord blood program was initiated in 1998 with a start-up grant from the Bill & Melinda Gates Foundation.

In addition to its blood transfusion programs, Bloodworks Northwest also operates a hematology research institute. The Bloodworks Northwest Research Institute is housed in a facility in the Eastlake neighborhood of Seattle. According to the organization, it employs a scientific staff of about 70.
