= Oklahoma Blood Institute =

6th largest blood Collector in USA

Oklahoma Blood Institute is a 501(c)(3) nonprofit organization that operates in Oklahoma, Texas and Arkansas. It is the sixth largest blood collector in the United States and is the primary provider of blood products to over 160 hospitals and healthcare facilities. The organization is accredited by AABB (Association for the Advancement of Blood & Biotherapies), and the Foundation for the Accreditation of Cellular Therapy (FACT); licensed by the Food and Drug Administration; and holds membership in America's Blood Centers (ABC), Blood Centers of America (BCA), and the Alliance for Community Transfusion Services (ACTS).

The organization is headquartered in Oklahoma City, Oklahoma. Dr. John Armitage serves as Oklahoma Blood Institute's President and Chief Executive Officer.
