= LifeSouth Community Blood Centers =

Southeastern blood bank network

Coordinates: 29.6531°N 82.3864°W

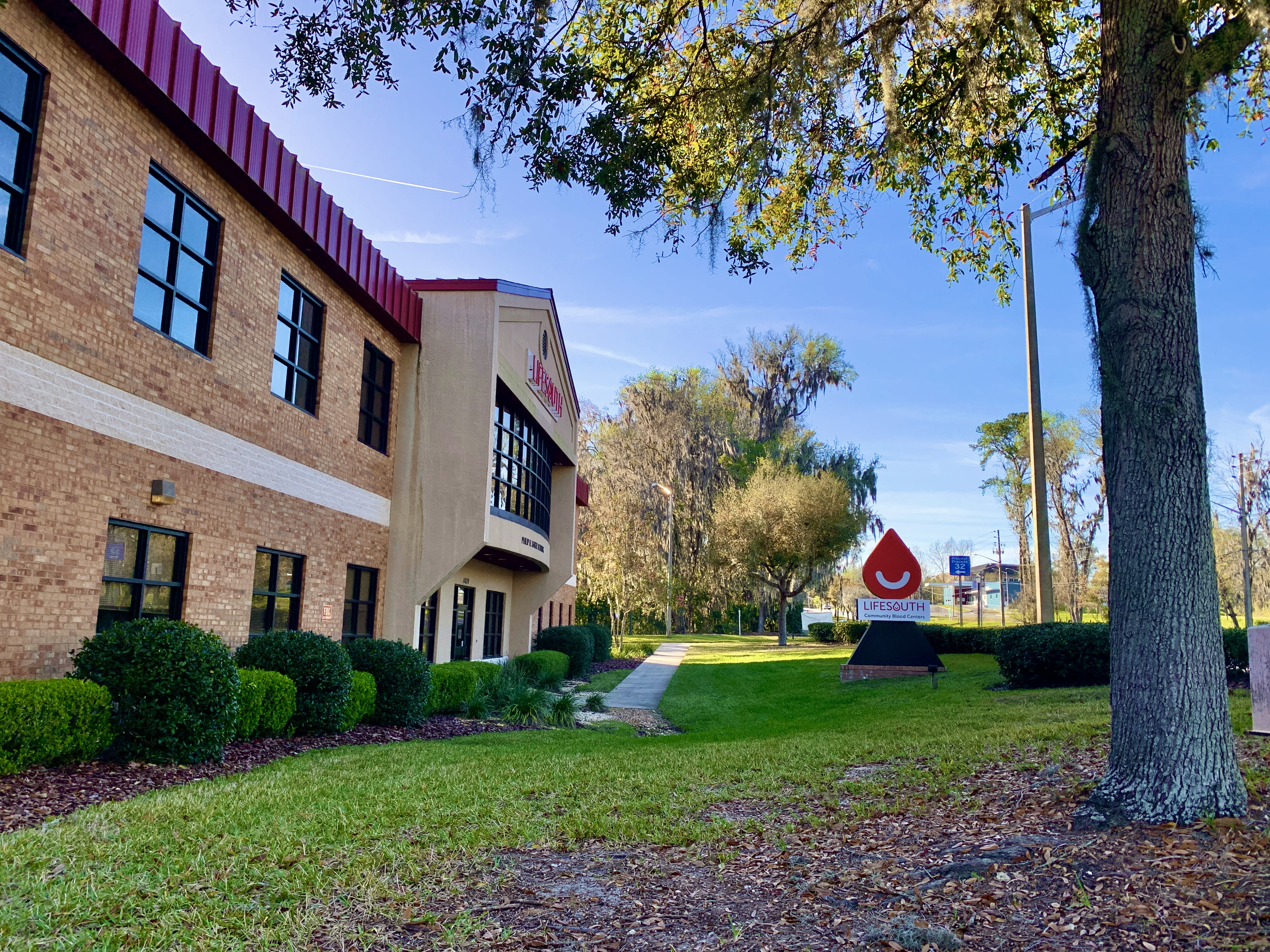
- Headquarters, February 2021
- Founded: 1974
- Founder: Gainesville Civitan Club
- Type: 501(c)(3) non-profit
- Tax ID no.: 59-1545914
- Location: 4039 Newberry Road Gainesville, Florida United States
- Region served: Southeastern United States
- Products: blood, blood products
- Key people: Kim Kinsell (CEO); Paul T. Grebe (CFO); Thomas H. Wurzbach III (CIO); JD Pettyjohn (COO)
- Revenue: $139.9 million (2024)
- Expenses: $133.5 million (2024)
- Endowment: $79.5 million (2024)
- Employees: 1,598
- Volunteers: 200
- Website: www.lifesouth.org
- Formerly called: Civitan Regional Blood Center

LifeSouth Community Blood Centers is a not-for-profit blood bank incorporated in Florida. LifeSouth is headquartered in Gainesville, Florida, and serves over 125 hospitals in Florida, Georgia and Alabama. It has formerly been known as Civitan Regional Blood Centers.

== History ==
In 1974, hospitals were in critical need of volunteer blood donors after the FDA curtailed the practice of paying donors for blood donations when tests linked many paid donors to the disease hepatitis. Gainesville, Florida hospitals (Alachua General Hospital, UF Health Shands Hospital and North Florida Regional Medical Center) all agreed that a non-profit community blood center was the answer and made an appeal to all local civic organizations. Civitan International was a supporter of hemophilia and the Gainesville Civitan Club was the only organization that agreed to take on this task. Fifteen members backed a $50,000 loan with their own money to start what they called the Civitan Regional Blood Center. Those individuals served as the first board of directors for the organization. Dr. Irving Weintraub was retiring and donated the use of his office on NW 13th Street as their first blood center. It was across the street from their subsequent office at 1221 NW 13th Street.

In the first year, the president of the board of directors was Reeves Byrd, with Phil Baker vice president. They employed 15 people, collected 7,000 units and purchased a blood mobile. Phil Baker was elected president after Reeves Byrd and was reelected every three years until 2009. The first four years were difficult, but retired Army Colonel Jim Glikes was hired as CEO in 1979 and his management was successful. In 1980 a second blood center began accepting donations in Lake City, Florida. Glikes died in 1993 and Nancy Eckert was named CEO. That year, a Birmingham, Alabama blood center opened. In 1995, a location in Atlanta, Georgia opened, and at Civitan's request, the organization's name was changed to LifeSouth Community Blood Centers. Just before the millennium, Westside Baptist Church outgrew their facility at 4039 Newberry Road and constructed a new campus at 10000 Newberry Road. LifeSouth purchased the property and it became a donor center and corporate headquarters in 2001. Renovations cost $5.2 million.

As of 2009, seven of the original 15 members were still serving on the board of directors. LifeSouth had operations in three states, employed 800 employees at 33 blood centers and on 45 bloodmobiles. Each year, over 120 medical facilities received the 330,000 units of blood processed by LifeSouth.

== Present ==
LifeSouth celebrated 50 years of service in 2024 and displayed their newly renovated donor center on Newberry Road which opened twenty years prior. Since its founding, LifeSouth has been the sole provider of blood in Gainesville and Alachua County. LifeSouth has 61 donation centers in Florida, Alabama and Georgia serving over 150 hospitals in those same three states plus Tennessee. More than 50 bloodmobiles facilitate 2,000 blood drives every month.

== Foundations and affiliates ==
=== LifeSouth Community Foundation ===
LifeSouth Community Foundation (LCF) is an affiliate that supports LifeSouth Community Blood Centers, a 501(c)(3) non-profit charitable organization. The LCF provides education and increases awareness of the ability to share life with others through donation of blood, cord blood, apheresis, organ, marrow and tissue donation.

=== LifeSouth Cord Blood Bank ===
LifeSouth Cord Blood Bank (LCBB) is a community-based cord blood bank responsible for collecting and storing umbilical cord blood for basic research and clinical cures utilized in transplanting stem cells. LCBB is a network member affiliated with the Be The Match Registry in the National Marrow Donor Program and the Center for International Blood and Marrow Transplant Research. LCBB performs donor and community education, cord blood collection/processing, cord blood unit distribution and evaluating transplant outcomes.

== See also ==
- Blood donation
- List of blood donation agencies in the United States
