= Gulf Coast Regional Blood Center =

Blood donation center in Houston, Texas

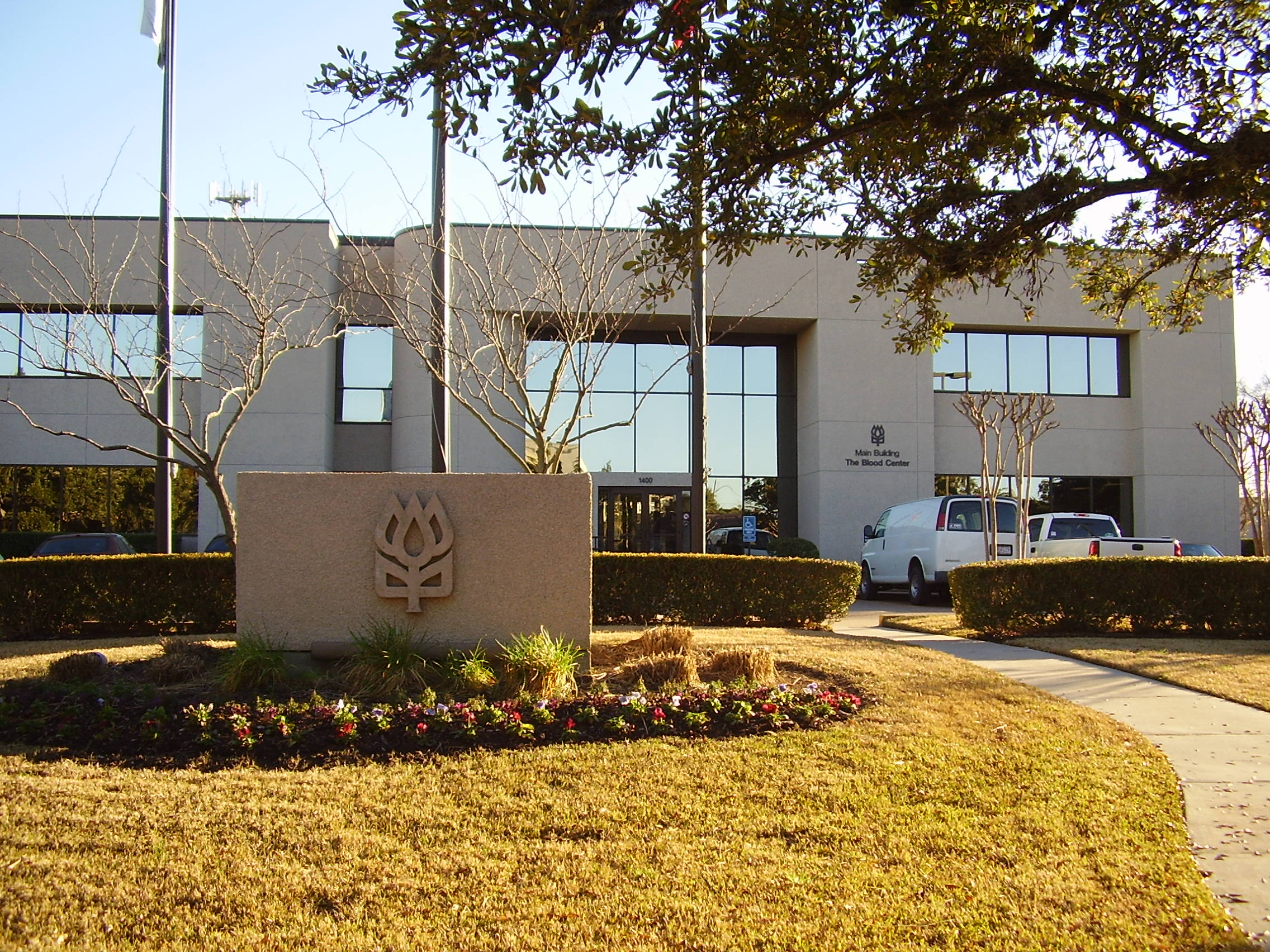
- Headquarters
- Company type: Nonprofit
- Industry: Healthcare
- Headquarters: 1400 La Concha Lane, Houston, USA
- Area served: Texas Gulf Coast, Brazos Valley and East Texas
- Products: Whole blood and blood components
- Website: www.giveblood.org

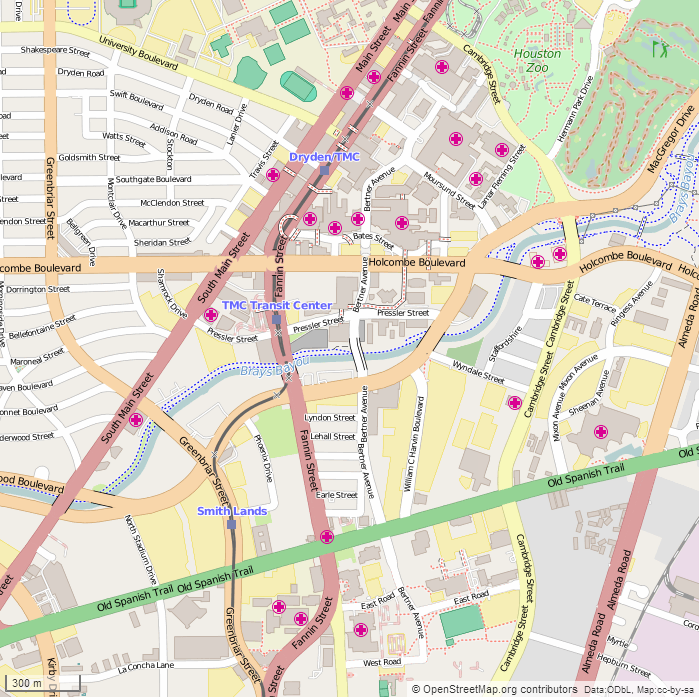
Location within Texas Medical Center

Gulf Coast Regional Blood Center is a nonprofit, independent blood donor center that gathers blood through donations and provides whole blood and blood products. The center meets the blood and blood component needs of patients being treated in more than 170 health care institutions in a 25-county Texas Gulf Coast, Brazos Valley and east Texas regions. Located in the Texas Medical Center in Houston, the center began operations on January 1, 1975. The Blood Center encourages individuals to Commit for Life, which is a partnership between the community and Gulf Coast Regional Blood Center that is focused on saving lives and permanently increasing the blood supply. The center is headquartered in Houston.

The center stated that, for it to serve its area effectively, it would have to collect 333,000 units in 2010, with more than 1,000 donations per day. Gulf Coast Regional Blood Center is a non-profit 501 (c) (3) organization and is accredited, licensed and inspected by American Association of Blood Banks, the Food and Drug Administration, Medicare as well as local and state authorities. In 2007, the center collected a total of 291,319 units of blood and blood components, exceeding 2006's record by more than 18,000 units.

The center is an accredited donor center for the National Marrow Donor Program and has recruited more than 90,000 potential donors who can donate bone marrow or hematopoietic cells. The center is one of the leading bone-marrow donor centers in the country and is the leading center for minority recruitment according to the National Marrow Donor Program. The center's marrow donor registry has a donor base of more than 100,000 donors, and through 2007, facilitated 329 matches.

"Commit for Life" refers to the blood center's blood donation programs. Blood donations may be done on an individual basis, on a group basis, or on a volunteer basis.

== See also ==
- Blood bank
- Blood products
- Blood donation
