= Blood Centers of the Pacific =

Blood center in northern California

Blood Centers of the Pacific was a community-based, nonprofit blood center collecting blood donations and provides safe blood and blood components for transfusion and also related services to more than 40 hospitals in the Bay Area and Northern California. Its predecessors included the first blood bank in the United States, which through expansions grew in the San Francisco and Sacramento areas. The Blood Centers of the Pacific name was retired in 2018 when parent Blood Systems, Inc., unified all of its regional operations under the Vitalant name.

== History ==
On June 17, 1941, the Irwin Memorial Blood Bank opened its doors in response to the lack of a sufficient method of obtaining and storing blood for later use – by both the military and community hospitals in the San Francisco area. The aim was to ensure that patients in the Bay Area would never again be without an adequate supply of blood. Irwin Memorial Blood Bank is credited as the first community blood bank in the United States.

The San Francisco County Medical Society granted the fledgling blood bank permission to operate out of the basement floor of an old San Francisco home, the Irwin Mansion. However, after years of growth, the blood bank had expanded its blood collection operations throughout Northern California, and it soon became clear that a bigger facility was needed for its headquarters. In April 1955, Irwin opened its new doors at Masonic and Turk Streets in San Francisco.

In 1997, the Irwin Memorial Blood Bank merged with the Peninsula Memorial Blood Bank to become Blood Centers of the Pacific, reflecting its larger service area. In 1999, Blood Centers of the Pacific affiliated with United Blood Services, the nation’s largest blood collection organization. Blood Centers of the Pacific merged with the Sacramento area's BloodSource blood center in 2015; United Blood Services changed its corporate brand name in 2018 to Vitalant and retired all of its regional brand names.

The Blood Systems Research Institute was housed at Blood Centers of the Pacific. It changed its name to Vitalant Research Institute as part of the rebranding.
