= America's Blood Centers =

Network of nonprofit blood banks

Founded in 1962, America's Blood Centers (ABC) is an association of independent non-profit blood centers that operates in Canada and the United States. ABC member organizations operate more than 600 blood collection sites providing close to 60 percent of the U.S., and a quarter of the Canadian, blood supply. These blood centers serve more than 150 million people and provide blood products and services to more than 3,500 hospitals and healthcare facilities across North America. All ABC U.S. members are licensed and regulated by the U.S. Food and Drug Administration. Kate Fry, MBA, CAE, currently leads the organization as Chief Executive Officer.

== Leadership ==
=== Chief Executive Officers (CEOs) ===
CEO
June 1986	March 2013	James MacPherson, MS
Sept. 20. 2013	May 2017	Christine Zambricki, DNAP, CRNA
April 2018	~	Kate Fry, MBA, CAE

=== Presidents ===
President
2005	2007	Merlyn H. Sayers, M.B., B.Ch., Ph.D.
2007	...	Donald Doddridge.
...	...	...
...	2013	Dan Waxman
2013	...	Dave Green
...	...	...
2017	2019	Martin Grable.
2019	2021	Mike Parejko.
2021	~	John B. Miller.

=== Chief Medical Officer ===
- Jed Gorlin, MD, MBA

=== Senior Director, Federal Government Affairs ===
- Diane Calmus, JD

=== Executive Director, ADRP, An International Division of ABC ===
- Carla Peterson

== Activities ==
=== ABC Awards of Excellence ===
The annual Awards of Excellence are given to individuals, civic groups, media organizations, corporations and advocates involved in blood donation through the awards ceremony. By 2021, it has been held for 24 years.

=== Annual Nexcare Give Program Celebrates ===
Nexcare is 3M's personal health care brand. Annual Nexcare Give Program Celebrates is a national event in partnership with the Nexcare brand, American Blood Centers, and the American Red Cross. The campaign aims to raise awareness and inspire action by providing donors with Nexcare bandages designed in a different theme each year as a badge of honor, and to thank donors and encourage others to participate on World Blood Donor Day (June 14).

==== 3rd Annual Nexcare give Program ====
- June 14–19, 2011.
- The bandage theme for this giveaway was derived from the latest runway trends of the time and featured vibrant designs such as V-shaped, plaid, chevron, zebra print, and "classic." The idea expressed in this issue is "helping to save a life is always in style."

==== 4th Annual Nexcare give Program ====
- June 11–14, 2012.
- The 2012 designs are drawn from the fashion, design, and pop culture of the 1950s through the 2000s, including everything from vintage polka dots and tie-dye to plaid checks. This vintage design conveys the theme of "giving blood is timeless".

==== 5th Annual Nexcare give Program ====
- June 10–14, 2013.
- The theme for 2013 is "It's Always in Season to Give Blood". All bandages this year have the text "give" and carry on the design inspiration from season 4.

==== 6th Annual Nexcare give Program ====
- June 9–14, 2014.
- The theme for 2014 is "The Art of Giving". The bandage designs include impressionism, abstract art, contemporary art, pop art, and street art. And each bandage has the word "give" on it.

==== 7th Annual Nexcare give Program ====
- June 8–14, 2015.
- In 2015, the Nexcare Give Program is themed "Creating a Culture of Giving". The designs were inspired by patterns and textiles from eight different cultures and locations.

==== 8th Annual Nexcare give Program ====
- June 6–14, 2016.
- This year, Nexcare's theme is "Feel the Beat, Give Blood." The bandages are inspired by five unique dances from different parts of the world.

==== 9th Annual Nexcare give Program ====
- June 7–14, 2017.
- Using landmarks and locations from cities around the world as inspiration, the 2017 bandages are designed around the theme "Roll up a sleeve and give where you live" to celebrate all those who give in their communities.

=== Congress Recognizes ===
In 2005 ABC Recognized by the House of Representatives:

"Resolved, That the House of Representatives— (1) recognizes the role of America's Blood Centers and its members in— (A) providing life saving blood to patients, including the military in times of war and the Nation in times of disaster; (B) ensuring the safety of that blood supply; and (C) promoting essential blood donor initiatives; (2) acknowledges the efforts made by member community blood centers and other blood organizations to promote and protect the safety and adequacy of blood components provided to patients; and (3) recognizes the need to promote a stable blood supply and increase volunteer participation of blood donors."

=== Global blood donation campaign ===
August 17, 2016, ABCparticipate in the multination Missing Type campaign. This campaign teaches awareness of the need for blood groups in 21 countries around the world.

=== Partnering with ADRP ===
May 2016, ADRP becomes an international division of ABC and will operate under a commercial charter. Together, the two bring expertise and capabilities to recruitment, blood collection and donor management, creating a better blood donation environment.

== Contribution during the Covid-19 pandemic ==
=== Expand Collection of Convalescent Plasma ===
Nearly 60% of U.S. blood is supplied by ABC-led community-based independent blood centers. Also 75% of COVID-19 Convalescent Plasma was provided by their combined efforts with BARDA.

=== Joint Statement ===
During the pandemic, the AABB, American Blood Centers, and the American Red Cross issued a statement that they were joining forces to collaborate on blood supply efforts during the pandemic

== Publications ==
=== ABC Newsletter ===
ABC Newsletter is a weekly publication that includes news from blood centers and other organizations in the transfusion community. Individuals who work at ABC member blood centers can subscribe for free. The annual fee is $390.

=== ABC Blood Bulletin ===
A quarterly journal written by experts in transfusion medicine and peer-reviewed by ABC's SMT Publications Committee.

== Partners ==
- AABB Interorganizational Task Force on Domestic Disasters and Acts of Terrorism
- Alliance of Blood Operators (ABO)
- American Rare Donor Program
- European Blood Alliance (EBA)
- National Marrow Donor Program (NMDP)
- Sickle Cell Disease Coalition
