= List of Alpha Epsilon Pi members =

This is a list of notable alumni of the Alpha Epsilon Pi fraternity.

| Name | Original chapter | Notability | Ref. |
|---|---|---|---|
| Sheldon Adelson | Honorary | Founder, Chairman and CEO of the Las Vegas Sands Corporation; philanthropist; established the Adelson Family Foundation, 24th-richest person in the world according to Forbes | |
| Ari Karp | Phi Gamma | Founder of Hotels.com and Getaroom.com | |
| Michael Albert | Mu Tau | Political activist and economist; co-founder and co-editor of Z Magazine | |
| Irving Azoff | Delta | Chairman and founder of Azoff Music Management Group; former president of MCA Records; former executive chairman of Live Nation | |
| Jason Bedrick | Beta Epsilon | Member of the New Hampshire state legislature | |
| Alan Baker | Honorary | Former Israeli Ambassador to Canada | |
| Gary Bettman | Beta | Commissioner of the National Hockey League (NHL) | |
| Wolf Blitzer | Upsilon Beta | Journalist, author, CNN correspondent | |
| Myles Brand | Rho Pi | President of the National Collegiate Athletic Association (2002-2009); President of Indiana University (1994-2002); President of the University of Oregon (1989-1994) | |
| James L. Brooks | Alpha | Academy Award and Emmy Award-winning producer and director | |
| Ken Chertow | Pi Deuteron | Former Olympic wrestler | |
| Brad Cohen | Beta Upsilon | Teacher, author, motivational speaker and subject of the film Front of the Class | |
| Jeff Cohen | Chi Alpha | Child actor (The Goonies) | |
| Irwin Cotler | Epsilon Chi | Former Minister of Justice and Attorney General of Canada | |
| Ian Eagle | Sigma Deuteron | Sports broadcaster | |
| Zach Tyler Eisen | Sigma Deuteron | Actor and voice actor; voice of Aang on Avatar: The Last Airbender | |
| Boris Epshteyn | Eta Sigma | Former White House Assistant Director of Communications for Surrogate Operations; Chief Political Analyst, Sinclair Broadcast Group | |
| Jay Feinberg | Honorary | Founder and CEO of the Gift of Life Marrow Registry | |
| Wayne Firestone | Kappa Deuteron | President and CEO of Hillel (2006-2013) | |
| Eric Fingerhut | Omicron Deuteron, Honorary | US Representative from Ohio (1993-1995); Ohio State Senator (1991-1992, 1999-2006); Chancellor of Ohio State Board of Regents (2007-2011); President and CEO of Hillel (2013-present) | |
| Zach Sage Fox | Gamma | pro-Israel internet personality | |
| Richard H. Frank | Delta | Former president of Walt Disney Studios | |
| Art Garfunkel | Iota | Singer and composer, half of Simon & Garfunkel | |
| Scott Garson | Sigma Beta | Head men's basketball coach at College of Idaho | |
| Frank Gehry | Upsilon | Pritzker Prize-winning architect | |
| Leonard Goldberg | Gamma | Former chairman of 20th Century Fox | |
| Neil Goldman | Epsilon Upsilon | Television writer and executive producer of Family Guy, Scrubs, and Worst Week | |
| Josh Gottheimer | Gamma | U.S. Representative for New Jersey's 5th congressional district | |
| Herb Gray | Honorary | Canada's first Jewish Cabinet member; Deputy Prime Minister of Canada (1997-2002); Chancellor of Carleton University (2008-2011) | |
| Patrick T. Harker | Gamma | President of University of Delaware; former dean of Wharton School of the University of Pennsylvania | |
| Yoel Hasson | Honorary | Member of the Knesset, Kadima Party | |
| Rondae Hollis-Jefferson | Upsilon Alpha | Basketball player for the Beşiktaş Icrypex in the Basketbol Süper Ligi | |
| David Horowitz | Beta Upsilon | Television personality, consumer advocate | |
| H. Robert Horvitz | Mu Tau | Nobel Prize winner in Medicine | |
| Alan Jacobson | Kappa Chi | American author of mystery, suspense, thriller and action novels | |
| Allan Jaffe | Gamma | Family owner of New Orleans' Preservation Hall | |
| Richard Joel | Alpha | President of Yeshiva University; former International Director of Hillel | |
| Tomer Kagan | Sigma Zeta | Founder of Quixey, a search engine for apps | |
| Ron Klein | Eta | Former member of the United States House of Representatives for Florida's 22nd congressional district | |
| Jerry Lewis | Sigma | Comedian; Chairman of the Muscular Dystrophy Association | |
| Richard Lewis | Eta | Actor, comedian | |
| Howard Lorber | Alpha Epsilon | CEO and President of Vector Group; Chairman of Nathan's Famous | |
| Daniel Magder | Beta Chi | Actor (Life With Derek) | |
| Josh Mandel | Eta | State Treasurer of Ohio; United States Senate candidate | |
| Bernard Marcus | Rho Upsilon | Cofounder of Home Depot | |
| Steven Markowitz | Gamma | Rapper under the stage name "Hoodie Allen" | |
| Justin Mateen | Upsilon | Founder of Tinder, a dating app | |
| Brad Meltzer | Omega Deuteron | New York Times bestselling author | |
| Charles C. Moskowitz | Alpha | Former president and treasurer of MGM Studios; fraternity founder | |
| Jerrold Nadler | Iota | United States Congressman, New York's 8th congressional district | |
| Ari Ne'eman | Mu Delta | Founder of Autistic Self Advocacy Network; first autistic presidential appointee | |
| Jordy Nelson | Kappa Sigma | Professional football player | |
| Robert Novak | Delta | Columnist, pundit and Crossfire panelist | |
| Mike Pesca | Epsilon | National Public Radio correspondent | |
| Jim Pollak | Beta Iota | 1992 Olympian; 1990 Goodwill Games gold medalist; four-time US National Champion in cycling | |
| Ron Popeil | Delta | Inventor; infomercial producer; owner of Ronco Industries | |
| Stanley B. Prusiner | Gamma | Nobel Prize winner in Medicine | |
| Jerry Reinsdorf | Kappa Deuteron | Owner of the Chicago Bulls and Chicago White Sox | |
| Adam Richman | Epsilon | Star of Man vs. Food on the Travel Channel | |
| Scott Rogowsky | Psi | Comedian and former host of HQ Trivia | |
| Abe Saperstein | Delta | Founder, former owner and earliest coach of the Harlem Globetrotters | |
| Eduardo Saverin | Eta Psi | Brazilian internet entrepreneur and investor; co-founder of Facebook | |
| Michael Schwerner | Beta | Civil rights worker killed on June 21, 1964, depicted in Mississippi Burning | |
| Samuel H. Shapiro | Delta | Former Governor of Illinois | |
| Levi Shemtov | Kappa Deuteron | Director of Chabad, Washington, D.C. | |
| Fred Silverman | Sigma Deuteron | Producer; former president of NBC Television | |
| Chet Simmons | Iota Deuteron | Founding president of ESPN | |
| Paul Simon | Kappa Chi | Singer, composer, half of Simon & Garfunkel | |
| Randy and Jason Sklar | Omega Deuteron | Actors, comedians; hosts of Cheap Seats on ESPN Classic as well as the Sklarbro Country and Dumb People Town podcasts | |
| Jeremy Smith | Delta | Creator of SpotHero, a parking app | |
| Steve Stone | Phi Deuteron | Cy Young Winner 1980; Baltimore Orioles, Chicago White Sox TV color analyst | |
| Richard Thaler | Tau Deuteron | Nobel Prize winner, Economics ’17 | |
| Matt Van Horn | Upsilon Alpha | Co-founder of Lyft (formerly Zimride), CEO and co-founder of June | |
| John E. Wallace, Jr. | Rho Deuteron | New Jersey Supreme Court Justice, appointed May 20, 2003 | |
| Sanford I. Weill | Beta | Co-chairman of Citigroup | |
| Matt Weitzman | Sigma Pi | Co-creator and Co-Executive Producer of American Dad! | |
| Gene Wilder | Iota Upsilon | Actor, producer, and director | |
| Walter Winchell | Lambda Deuteron | Gossip columnist, radio personality | |
| Robert Wittenberg | Beta Iota | Democratic politician currently representing the 27th District in the Michigan House of Representatives. | |
| Scott Wolf | Kappa Deuteron | Actor | |
| Sam Zell | Omega Deuteron | Real estate entrepreneur; co-founder and chairman of Equity International; owner of the Tribune Company | |
| Mark Zuckerberg | Eta Psi | Founder of Facebook | |

- Ross Friedman (born 1992), Major League Soccer player
- Italics indicate a deceased member. Deceased AEPis are said to enter the "Chapter Eternal."
