= National Marrow Donor Program =

Nonprofit organization hosting the world's largest hematopoietic cell registry

- Formerly: Be The Match
- Type: Non-profit
- Industry: Health care
- Founded: 1987; 39 years ago in St. Paul, Minnesota, U.S.
- Headquarters: Minneapolis, Minnesota, U.S.
- Key people: Amy Ronneberg (CEO)
- Number of employees: 996 (2019)
- Website: nmdp.org network.nmdp.org (practictioners)

The National Marrow Donor Program (NMDP), formerly known as Be The Match, is an American nonprofit organization founded in 1987 and based in Minneapolis, Minnesota. It operates a registry of volunteer hematopoietic cell donors and umbilical cord blood units in the United States and is under contract to operate the federally authorized C. W. Bill Young Cell Transplantation Program.

The NMDP Registry is the world's largest of its kind, with more than 22 million registered donors and over 300,000 cord blood units. These cells are used in transplants for patients with a range of blood, bone marrow, and immune system disorders. As of June 2026, NMDP had facilitated more than 150,000 transplants worldwide.

== Activities ==
NMDP coordinates the collection of hematopoietic ("blood-forming") cells that are used to perform what used to be called bone marrow transplants, but are now more properly called hematopoietic cell transplants. Patients needing a hematopoietic cell transplant but who lack a suitably matched donor in their family can search the NMDP Registry for a matched unrelated donor or cord blood unit.

Hematopoietic cells are used to transplant patients with life-threatening disorders such as leukemia, lymphoma, aplastic anemia, as well as certain immune system and metabolic disorders. Hematopoietic cells can come from bone marrow, umbilical cord blood, or the circulating blood (peripheral blood stem cells (PBSCs)). Hematopoietic cells are a type of adult (i.e., non-embryonic) stem cell that can multiply and differentiate into the three types of blood cells: red blood cells, white blood cells, and platelets.

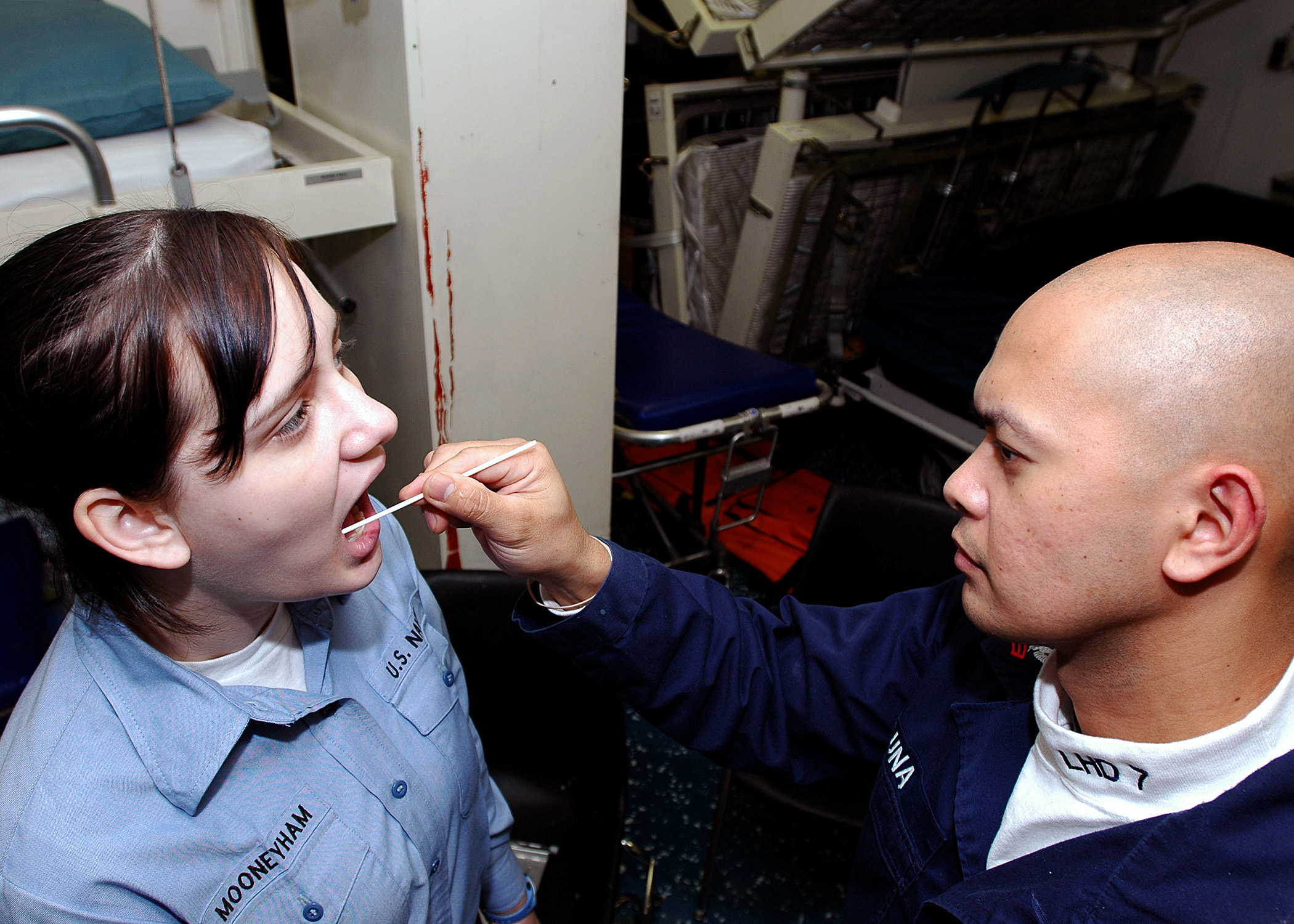
Cheek swab being obtained from a potential donor

== Collecting hematopoietic cells ==
Bone marrow and PBSCs come from living adult donors; they can be extracted from the bone marrow or from the blood. Bone marrow is extracted from the donor's pelvic bones while the donor is under general or local anesthesia. PBSCs are collected from the donor's blood after five or six days of taking a drug that causes hematopoietic cells in the bone marrow to move into the circulating blood. In both cases, recovery is usually swift and donors typically have fully restored marrow and blood cell counts in under two weeks.

Cord blood cells are obtained from the umbilical cord and placenta of a newborn baby after the cord is clamped and cut as in a normal delivery. The cord blood is then stored frozen in a bank until needed for a transplant. The baby is not harmed in any way by this collection, as the cord blood is collected from tissues that in the past had been discarded as medical waste.

== The need for large registries ==
The NMDP Registry is one of many registries of unrelated donors and cord blood units in the world. Most large, developed nations have such registries. Large registries of unrelated donors are needed because only about 30% of patients with diseases treatable with hematopoietic cell transplantation can find a fully HLA matched donor among their family members.

The remaining 70% require an unrelated hematopoietic cell donor as a transplant source. Because the odds that two random individuals are HLA matched exceeds one in 20,000, a registry's success depends on a large number of volunteer donors.

== Method of operation ==
NMDP coordinates hematopoietic cell transplants by managing a worldwide network of affiliated organizations. These organizations (mostly hospitals and blood banks) have established relationships with the NMDP and work together to arrange the collection and transfer of donated bone marrow or PBSCs, or the transfer of previously collected cord blood.

When an adult volunteer donor (marrow or PBSC) registers with the NMDP, their HLA and contact information is sent to the NMDP, which stores it in their computers. The NMDP also has nearly 238,000 cord blood units, listed by HLA type, in its registry. These cord blood units are stored at 19 NMDP-affiliated cord blood banks around the world.

Physicians look for donor material on behalf of a patient by submitting the patient's HLA tissue type to NMDP, which then searches its computerized database for matching donor (marrow or PBSC) or cord blood units.

If NMDP finds a match with an adult donor, they notify the donor. After educating the potential donor about the donation process, NMDP asks them to donate. If the potential donor wishes to proceed, they receive a medical exam, which includes testing the blood for infectious diseases. If the potential donor meets all requirements, NMDP collects their bone marrow or peripheral blood stem cells and sends them by courier to the patient.

If NMDP finds a match to a cord blood unit, they notify the cord blood bank that stores that unit and arrange to send it to the patient. Cord blood units are shipped frozen, in specially designed coolers, and are thawed after arrival at the patient's hospital. The transplant physician evaluating the patient considers a number of clinical factors to decide whether to use an adult donor's marrow or PBSC, or cord blood for a particular patient.

== International connections ==
NMDP cooperates with World Marrow Donor Association (WMDA), an organization that coordinates communications among the world's registries. BMDW is based in Leiden, The Netherlands. Throughout the world, there are an estimated 30 million volunteer hematopoietic cell donors. Most national registries, including NMDP's registry, have access to these worldwide volunteer donors, either through the BMDW or through individually arranged agreements.

Although based in the United States, NMDP has worldwide connections. More than 50 percent of the transplants arranged by NMDP involve either a foreign patient or a foreign donor. NMDP contracts with seven donor centers (where donors are recruited) outside of the United States. These are located in The Netherlands, Israel, Sweden, Norway, and Germany (three centers).

In addition, NMDP is affiliated with many transplant centers (where patients can receive transplants using cells from NMDP donors) outside of the United States.

== Other United States registries ==
Although NMDP operates the sole federally funded and Congressionally authorized stem cell registry in the United States, another domestic registry exists.

- The Gift of Life Marrow Registry, based in Boca Raton, Florida, was established in 1991 as a recruitment organization increasing ethnic diversity by enrolling donors of Jewish ancestry during the grassroots groundbreaking drives for New Jersey patient Jay Feinberg. Now serving the broader community, its registry includes nearly 500,000 volunteer donors, resulting in over 17,000 matches and over 5,000 transplants. Gift of Life is accredited by the World Marrow Donor Association.
- DKMS US, in New York City is part of the larger DKMS donor center based in Germany and hosts donor drives nationwide and lists those who register on the Be The Match registry, run by the NMDP.

In May 2004, the Gift of Life Marrow Registry and NMDP formed an associate donor registry partnership.

In July 2007, the Caitlin Raymond International Registry became an affiliated registry with NMDP. Caitlin Raymond closed its doors a few years later.

== Finances ==
NMDP receives annually about US$23 million from the US government through the Health Resources and Services Administration. The US Navy also provides some funding.

The program also receives income from donations, from monetary donations from tissue donors for tissue typing (about $50 as of 2008), from fees charged for in-depth database searches (initial searches are free, full searches can cost several thousand dollars), and from the fees charged to the transplanting hospital once a match is found and the stem cells have been transferred. The latter charge amounts to about $21,000, which is somewhat more than other registries in the US and abroad charge. (The final cost to the patient or the patient's insurance company for the completed transplant can range from $100,000 to $250,000.)

NMDP pays affiliated donor centers and recruitment groups for every new donor they sign up.

== See also ==
- Center for International Blood and Marrow Transplant Research
