= DATRI =

Nonprofit organization for blood stem cell donation in India

DATRI Blood Stem Cell Donors Registry
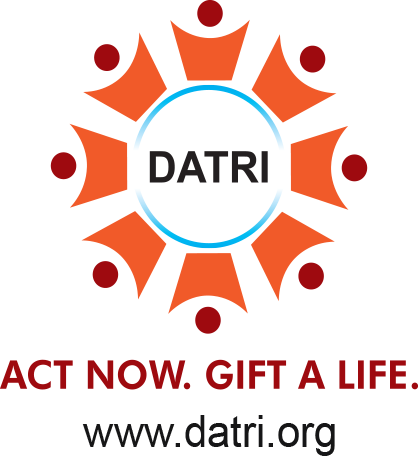
- Founded: 2009
- Type: NGO
- Purpose: Works for patients with blood cancer, aplastic anemia, Thalassemia and other severe blood disorders.
- Location: Chennai, India
- Region served: Global
- Key people: Dr. Nezih Cereb (Co-founder & Chairperson); Dr. Soo Young Yang (Co-founder & Director); Darasing Khurana (Brand Ambassador)
- Website: datri.org

DATRI (meaning 'donor' in Sanskrit) is a not-for-profit organization registered in 2009 as a Section 8 company under Government of India. DATRI is one of the largest unrelated blood stem cell donors registry in India, that helps patients with blood cancer and other fatal blood disorders to find a HLA (Human Leukocyte Antigen) matched Blood Stem Cell donor. Blood stem cell transplant is a chance of cure for patients with blood cancer and other severe blood disorders. As of January 2023, DATRI has more than 5 lakhs voluntary donors registered and it has facilitated 1074 plus transplants worldwide. DATRI operates across India.

== History ==
DATRI was founded by Dr. Nezih Cereb and Dr. Soo Young Yang in 2009. The NGO works with a mission to save the lives of patients with Blood Cancer, aplastic anemia, Thalassemia and other severe blood disorders. In 2017 the foundation appointed Darasing Khurana, who was awarded Mr. India International in 2017, as its Brand Ambassador. The organisation was started with the objective of finding willing HLA matched donor for every patient with fatal blood related disorders and in need of a blood stem cell transplant.

DATRI is a registered member of World Marrow Donor Association (WMDA) and lists the HLA typing information anonymously in Bone Marrow Donors Worldwide (BMDW), a search program of WMDA available to Transplant Centers globally It is currently India's largest Blood Stem Cell Donor's Registry. In June 2022 it created a milestone in the history of unrelated blood stem cell donations in India by facilitating its 1000th blood stem cell collection.

In December 2019, DATRI celebrated 10 years of saving lives in Chennai. So far 1074 donors from DATRI have given patients a second chance of life. As of January 2023, DATRI had over 5 lakhs registered donors. DATRI had been spreading awareness on registering as a Blood Stem Cell Donor through numerous drives and camps in educational Institutions, corporates and residential areas since its inception in year 2009. These campaigns had resulted in creating considerable awareness in society among youngsters and professionals. The campaigns helped in increasing the number of volunteer donors for donating blood stem cells to save the life of an unrelated patient. Currently DATRI is India's largest adult unrelated blood stem cells donors registry with more than 5 lakhs registered volunteer donors and has facilitated around 1074 donations to date including donations from International patients and also serviced patients from over 125 hospitals from across world.

== Awards and recognition ==
DATRI has received several recognition for their work. The most notable award DATRI has received is the Global NGO Excellence Award under the Best Healthcare NGO category in 2018. other awards they received include

2016:

- GuideStar India Transparency Key Award

== See also ==
- List of non-governmental organizations in India
- Young India Foundation
- National Marrow Donor Program
- Bone Marrow Donors Worldwide (BMDW)
