= Caracappa =

Caracappa is an Italian family name, shared by:

- Matt Caracappa, owner of X-Entertainment.com and dinosaurdracula.com
- Stephen Caracappa, New York police officer convicted of working for the mafia
- Phil Caracappa, American MMA fighter
