= Piero's Italian Cuisine =

Italian restaurant in Las Vegas, Nevada

Restaurant information
- Established: 1982
- Owner: Stephen Siegel
- Previous owner: Freddie Glusman
- Food type: Italian cuisine
- Location: 355 Convention Center Dr, Las Vegas, Nevada
- Website: https://www.pieroscuisine.com/

Piero's Italian Cuisine is an Italian restaurant in Las Vegas, Nevada, United States, located near the Las Vegas Convention Center. It was opened in 1982 by Freddie Glusman and is known for its popularity among a wide range of clientele. It has also served as a filming location for the 1995 film Casino.

== Description ==
The restaurant is situated on Convention Center Drive between the Strip and Paradise Road. It has six dining rooms and has an old-school, fine dining Italian aesthetic.

=== Menu ===
The restaurant serves Italian cuisine, and the menu has mostly remained the same since the restaurant's establishment. One of Piero's most known dish is its osso buco and sells between 90 and 130 every day.

=== Clientele ===
Piero's has been noted for its wide ranging customer base, including business figures, entertainers, and public officials.

== History ==
Piero's Italian Cuisine was founded in 1982 by restaurateur Freddie Glusman. Initially operating from a smaller location in Las Vegas with an 88-seat capacity, the restaurant later relocated to a larger venue on Convention Center Drive as demand increased.

In 2005, former New York City police detectives Stephen Caracappa and Louis Eppolito were arrested at the restaurant.

In 2020, the restaurant temporarily closed during the COVID-19 pandemic and reopened in September 2021.

In 2025, the restaurant was acquired by businessman Stephen Siegel and incorporated into his Amazing Brands portfolio.

== In popular media ==
Piero's Italian Cuisine was used as a filming location for the 1995 film Casino, including scenes featuring Robert De Niro, Sharon Stone and Joe Pesci.
