= Darasing Khurana =

Indian actor and model

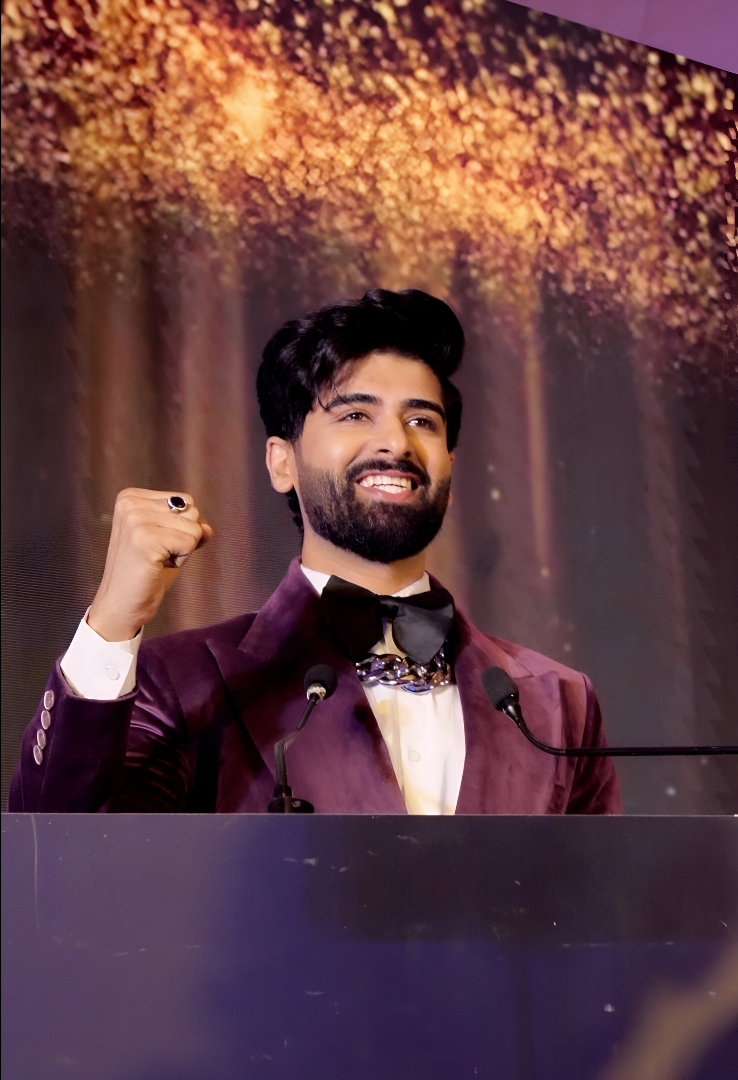
- Darasing Khurana at an event in 2023
- Born: Parbhani, Maharashtra, India
- Education: Narsee Monjee Institute of Management Studies (NMIMS), Mumbai; H.R. College of Commerce and Economics, Mumbai; Symbiosis International University, Pune; Queen's School, Parbhani
- Occupations: Actor and philanthropist
- Height: 6 ft (1.8 m)
- Beauty pageant titleholder
- Title: Mister International India 2017; Commonwealth Global Youth Ambassador
- Years active: 2013–present
- Hair color: Black
- Eye color: Brown
- Major competitions: Mister International India 2017 (Winner)

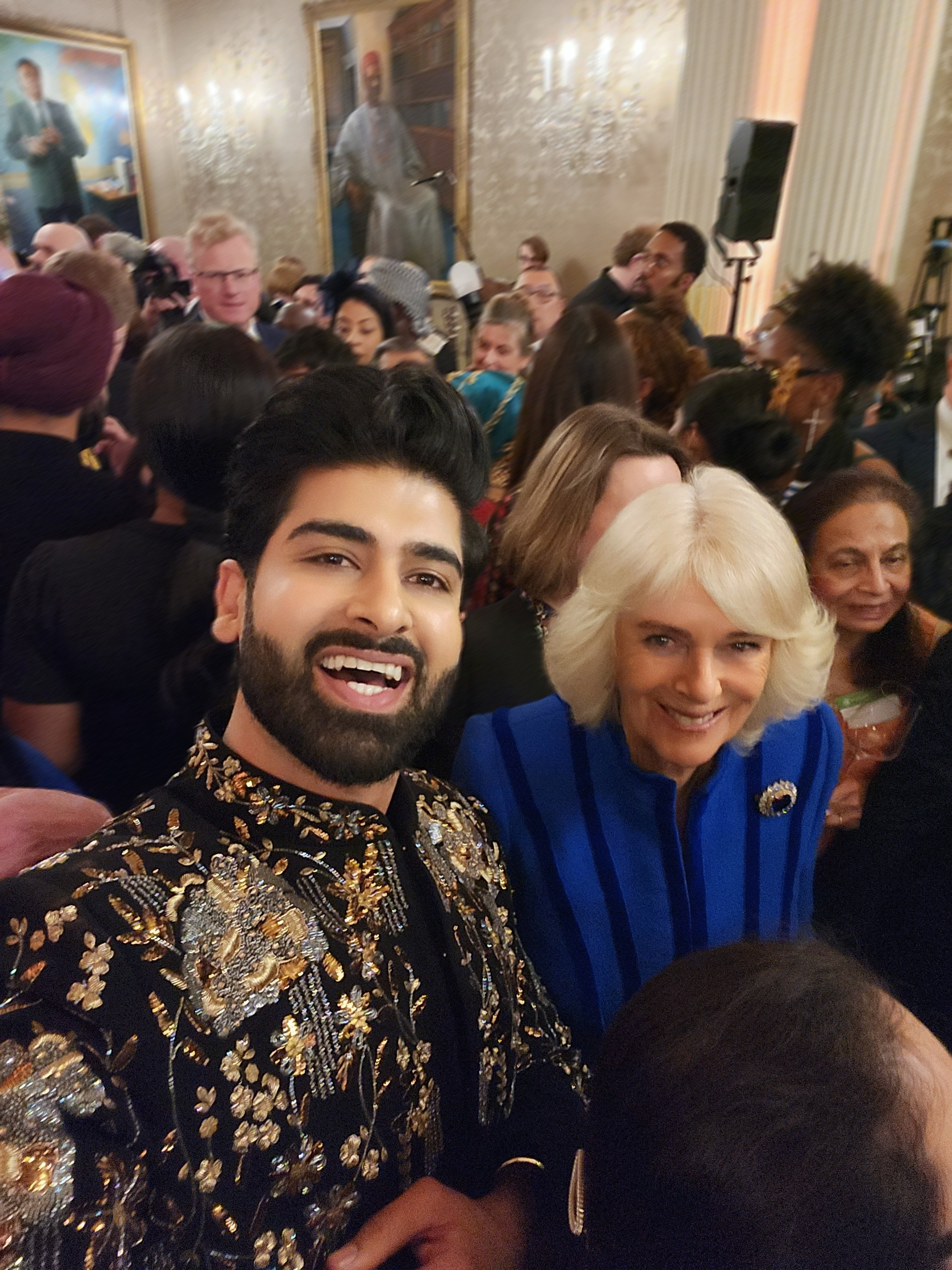
Darasing Khurana selfie with Her Majesty Queen Camilla

Darasing Khurana is an Indian actor, host and philanthropist who rose to fame after winning the Mr. India International 2017 title and representing India in Mr. International 2018. Khurana has been involved in various initiatives, including his role as Commonwealth's Global Youth Ambassador. He is the first Asian and the second person globally to hold the title alongside Prince Edward of the UK. Under his role, he serves as a spokesperson, advocate, and contributes to policy discussions concerning the future of youth across 56 Commonwealth countries. He also serves as the brand Ambassador of Datri, a blood stem cell donor registry in India. Khurana has been recognized as a Global Peace Ambassador and has taken part in engagements, including meetings with leaders such as King Charles, Queen Camilla, Singapore's Prime Minister Lawrence Wong, and Samoa's Prime Minister Fiame Naomi Mataʻafa amongst others .

Khurana served as the keynote speaker at the Global Mental Health Summit 2024 at the Oxford University. He was invited at Cambridge University to speak on the topic ' Role of Creative sector in Global Peace Building' in October 2024. Khurana is also serves as UNICEF Goodwill Ambassador.

== Early life and background ==
Darasing Khurana was born on January 12, 1992, in the town of Parbhani, Maharashtra. His family is Punjabi. He attended Queen's School, Parbhani and Symbiosis College of Commerce and Economics, Pune and H.R. College of Commerce and Economics, Mumbai, before receiving a master's degree in Business Management from the Narsee Monjee Institute of Management Studies (NMIMS).

== Career ==
He started performing theatre at the age of 4. At 14, he participated in Mr. Parbhani competition, a local pageant in his hometown, and won the competition. He later came to Mumbai, and graduated from H.R. College of Commerce and Economics there.

While he was studying, he became a part time model and walked the runway at numerous Indian and International fashion shows, including the Lakme Fashion Week, Bangalore Style Week, India International Style Week, India Luxury Style Week, as well as other fashion events.

In 2017, he won the Rubaru Mr. India International 2017 and represented India at Mister International.

Khurana has walked for several fashion shows as a show stopper and as a closing model, including Royal Fables. he also walked as a show stopper along with former Miss Universe Lara Dutta Bhupati at the page3 Awards.

Khurana is the Brand Ambassador of DATRI, an India-based blood stem cell donors registry. and Goodwill Ambassador of Kunwar Global School.

He is the founder of Pause.Breath.Talk Foundation, an initiative to help those suffering from mental health problems.

Khurana is a part of UNICEF initiative and was invited to speak on the impact of climate change on children's lives in an event held in November 2020.

In July 2023, Khurana teamed up with UNICEF India and Asia's largest student-run social organization, Abhyuday of IIT Bombay.

== Philanthropy ==
Khurana founded the Pause.Breath.Talk foundation after the untimely death of his friend and fellow actor, Sushant Singh Rajput. The foundation aims to make therapy affordable and accessible to young people suffering from mental health problems. Additionally, he serves as the brand ambassador of DATRI, which helps match donors with individuals in need of blood stem cells in India. Furthermore, he is involved with UNICEF and supports various other charitable causes. He is also associated with the social cause 'Daughters are precious' in Rajasthan.

== Position held ==
Darasing Khurana has started his role as the Commonwealth Year of Youth Champion by concentrating on mental health projects. This came after he met with Queen Camilla and talked with Secretary-General Baroness Patricia Scotland in London. In February 2024, Khurana was appointed as the Commonwealth Youth Champion for 2024, becoming the first Asian and the second person overall to hold the title.

== Engagements and Key Events ==
In 2024, Darasing Khurana was invited to meet Queen Camilla of the United Kingdom, wife of King Charles III, in London.

He was also a keynote speaker at the Global Mental Health Summit at Oxford University, where he was appointed as the Global Mind Health Ambassador.

In 2024, Khurana attended the Commonwealth Heads of Government Meeting (CHOGM) as a special guest of the Commonwealth Secretary-General. During the event, he moderated a panel discussion on mental health, which included Samoa's Prime Minister, Fiame Naomi Mata’afa, Commonwealth Secretary-General Patricia Scotland, and United Nations Under-Secretary-General Rabab Fatima.

Khurana hosted Pink Power Run 2025 in Hyderabad that was attended by over 20000 people. He was joined by Miss World 2025 Opal Suchata, Julia Morley, Chairperson and CEO of Miss World Organisation, Olympian Leander Paes and Philanthropist Sudha Reddy.

== International broadcast ==
Khurana co-hosted the International Youth Live event alongside Lady Dentaa Amoateng, MBE, at Marlborough House in London. The event featured various launches, interviews, and content highlighting Year of Youth activities. It was broadcast live across 56 Commonwealth nations. During the event, Khurana conducted interviews with notable figures, including Sarah Ferguson, Duchess of York, several United Nations officials, representatives from Cambridge University, and other dignitaries.

In 2025, Khurana hosted International Peace One Day broadcast streaming worldwide from London on to mark the UN International Day of Peace alongside Laura Whitmore where he interviewed international personalities like Actor Jude Law, Richard Branson and Dia Mirza.

== Filmography ==
=== Films ===
Year	Title	Role(s)	Notes	Ref
2022	Bai Ji Kuttange	Dara		
2023	Bandra			
2024	Kaagaz 2	Manminder		

=== Television ===
Year	Title	Role	Notes	Ref.
2018	Hear Me. Love Me.	Dara		

=== Music videos ===
Year	Title	Singer(s)	Ref.
2020	Prarthana - Hope for Humanity		

== Awards and recognition ==
- 2017: Awarded the Most Promising Face of the year at WOW Icon Personality Awards.
- 2018: Received the 'Style Icon of the year 2018’ at Rajasthan Style awards
- 2018: Honored with Wow Starlite Excellence Awards in Pune
- 2019: Honored with The Indian Achiever's Award
- 2022: Khurana received the Humanitarian of the Year Award from the state’s former Governor, [[Bhagat Singh Koshyari]], at the Global Wellness Awards 2022. The ceremony took place on June 15, 2022, at the Maharashtra Rajbhavan.
- 2024: Mahatma Gandhi Leadership Award held in UK
- 2025: Championing Conscious Influencer award at the ELLE Sustainability Awards

== See also ==
- Top Model India
- Rohit Khandelwal
- Milind Soman
- Nitin Chauhaan
