= Hematopoietic stem cell transplantation =

Medical procedure to replace blood or immune stem cells

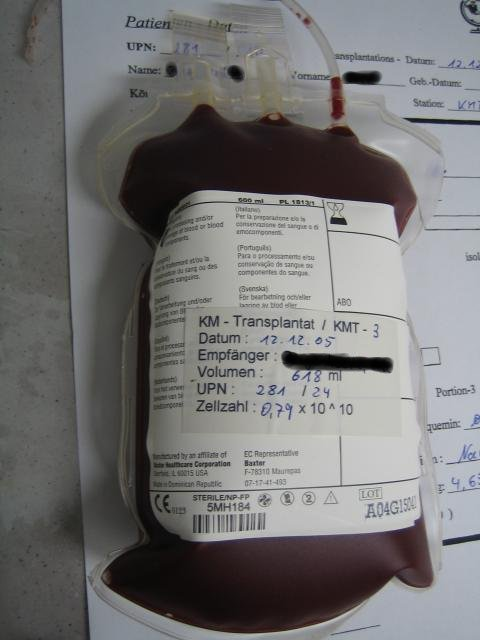
- Bone marrow transplant
- ICD-9-CM: 41.0
- MeSH: D018380
- MedlinePlus: 003009

Hematopoietic stem-cell transplantation (HSCT) is the transplantation of multipotent hematopoietic stem cells, usually derived from bone marrow, peripheral blood, or umbilical cord blood, in order to replicate inside a patient and produce additional normal blood cells. HSCT may be autologous (the patient's own stem cells are used), syngeneic (stem cells from an identical twin), or allogeneic (stem cells from a donor).

It is most often performed for patients with certain cancers of the blood or bone marrow, such as multiple myeloma, leukemia, some types of lymphoma and immune deficiencies. In these cases, the recipient's immune system is usually suppressed with radiation or chemotherapy before the transplantation. Infection and graft-versus-host disease are major complications of allogeneic HSCT. It remains a dangerous procedure with many possible complications; it is reserved for patients with life-threatening diseases. As survival following the procedure has increased, its use has expanded beyond cancer to autoimmune diseases and hereditary skeletal dysplasias, notably malignant infantile osteopetrosis and mucopolysaccharidosis.

== Medical uses ==
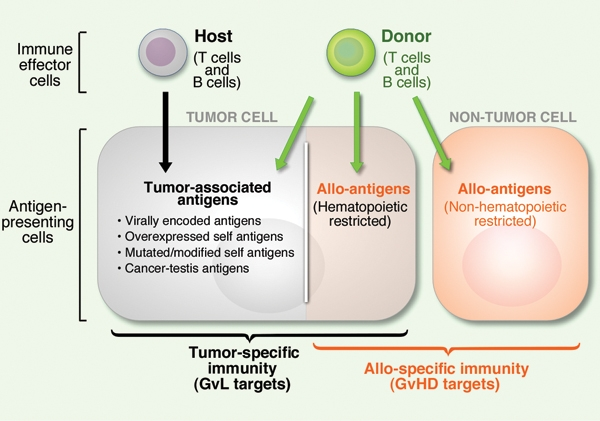
The spectrum of target antigens associated with tumor immunity and alloimmunity after allogeneic HSCT: Host-derived T and B cells can be induced to recognize tumor-associated antigens, whereas donor-derived B and T cells can recognize both tumor-associated antigens and alloantigens.

=== Indications ===
Indications for stem-cell transplantation are:

==== Malignant (cancerous) ====
- Acute myeloid leukemia
- Chronic myeloid leukemia
- Acute lymphoblastic leukemia
- Juvenile myelomonocytic leukemia
- Hodgkin lymphoma (relapsed, refractory)
- Non-Hodgkin lymphoma (relapsed, refractory)
- Neuroblastoma
- Ewing sarcoma
- Multiple myeloma
- Myelodysplastic syndromes
- Gliomas, other solid tumors

==== Nonmalignant (noncancerous) ====
- Thalassemia
- Sickle cell anemia
- Aplastic anemia
- Fanconi anemia
- Malignant infantile osteopetrosis
- Mucopolysaccharidosis
- Paroxysmal nocturnal hemoglobinuria
- Pyruvate kinase deficiency
- Immune deficiency syndromes
- Autoimmune diseases, including multiple sclerosis

Many recipients of HSCTs are multiple myeloma or leukemia patients who would not benefit from prolonged treatment with, or are already resistant to, chemotherapy. Candidates for HSCTs include pediatric cases where the patient has an inborn defect such as severe combined immunodeficiency or congenital neutropenia with defective stem cells, and also children or adults with aplastic anemia who have lost their stem cells after birth. Other conditions treated with stem cell transplants include sickle cell disease, myelodysplastic syndrome, neuroblastoma, lymphoma, Ewing's sarcoma, desmoplastic small round cell tumor, chronic granulomatous disease, Hodgkin's disease and Wiskott–Aldrich syndrome. Non-myeloablative, so-called mini transplant (microtransplantation) procedures, have been developed requiring smaller doses of preparative chemotherapy and radiation therapy, allowing HSCT to be conducted in the elderly and other patients who would otherwise be considered too weak to withstand a conventional treatment regimen.

=== Number of procedures ===
In 2006, 50,417 first HSCTs were recorded worldwide, according to a global survey of 1,327 centers in 71 countries conducted by the Worldwide Network for Blood and Marrow Transplantation. Of these, 28,901 (57%) were autologous and 21,516 (43%) were allogeneic (11,928 from family donors and 9,588 from unrelated donors). The main indications for transplant were lymphoproliferative disorders (55%) and leukemias (34%), and many took place in either Europe (48%) or the Americas (36%).

The Worldwide Network for Blood and Marrow Transplantation reported the millionth transplant to have been undertaken in December 2012.

In 2014, according to the World Marrow Donor Association, stem-cell products provided for unrelated transplantation worldwide had increased to 20,604 (4,149 bone-marrow donations, 12,506 peripheral blood stem-cell donations, and 3,949 cord-blood units).

== Graft types ==
=== Autologous ===
Autologous HSCT requires the extraction (apheresis) of hematopoietic stem cells (HSCs) from the patient and storage of the harvested cells in a freezer. The patient is then treated with high-dose chemotherapy with or without radiotherapy with the intention of eradicating the patient's malignant cell population at the cost of partial or complete bone marrow ablation (destruction of patient's bone marrow's ability to grow new blood cells). The patient's own stored stem cells are then transfused into their bloodstream, where they replace destroyed tissue and resume the patient's normal blood-cell production. Autologous transplants have the advantage of lower risk of infection during the immune-compromised portion of the treatment, since the recovery of immune function is rapid. Also, the incidence of patients experiencing rejection is very rare (and graft-versus-host disease impossible) due to the donor and recipient being the same individual. These advantages have established autologous HSCT as one of the standard second-line treatments for such diseases as lymphoma.

For other cancers such as acute myeloid leukemia, though, the reduced mortality of the autogenous relative to allogeneic HSCT may be outweighed by an increased likelihood of cancer relapse and related mortality, so the allogeneic treatment may be preferred for those conditions.

Autologous HSCT is also used as a treatment option for specific autoimmune conditions. It has been shown to be an effective treatment for multiple sclerosis in selected patients. It is used as a treatment option in cases where 'high-efficacy' treatments have failed, or in patients with aggressive, highly-active disease or other poor prognostic markers. The type of autologous HSCT used as a multiple sclerosis treatment is considered relatively safe and the serious adverse events rare. Researchers have conducted small studies using nonmyeloablative HSCT as a possible treatment for type 1 diabetes mellitus in children and adults. Results have been promising, but as of 2019, speculating whether these experiments will lead to effective treatments for diabetes is premature.

=== Allogeneic ===
Allogeneic HSCT involves two people – the (healthy) donor and the (patient) recipient. Allogeneic HSC donors must have a tissue (human leukocyte antigen, HLA) type that matches the recipient. Matching is performed on the basis of variability at three or more loci of the HLA gene, and a perfect match at these loci is preferred. Even if a good match exists at these critical alleles, the recipient will require immunosuppressive medications to mitigate graft-versus-host disease. Allogeneic transplant donors may be related (usually a closely HLA-matched sibling), syngeneic (a monozygotic or identical twin of the patient – necessarily extremely rare since few patients have an identical twin, but offering a source of perfectly HLA-matched stem cells), unrelated (donor who is not related and found to have very close degree of HLA matching), or, as in the case of Haploidentical Transplantation, a half-matched relative such as a parent, child, or sibling. Unrelated donors may be found through a registry of bone-marrow donors, such as the National Marrow Donor Program (NMDP) in the U.S. A "savior sibling" may be intentionally selected by preimplantation genetic diagnosis to match a child both regarding HLA type and being free of any obvious inheritable disorder. Allogeneic transplants are also performed using umbilical cord blood as the source of stem cells. In general, by transfusing healthy stem cells to the recipient's bloodstream to reform a healthy immune system, allogeneic HSCTs appear to improve chances for cure or long-term remission once the immediate transplant-related complications are resolved.

A compatible donor is found by doing additional HLA testing from the blood of potential donors. The HLA genes fall in two categories (types I and II). In general, mismatches of the type-I genes (i.e. HLA-A, HLA-B, or HLA-C) increase the risk of graft rejection. A mismatch of an HLA type II gene (i.e. HLA-DR or HLA-DQB1) increases the risk of graft-versus-host disease. In addition, a genetic mismatch as small as a single DNA base pair is significant, so perfect matches require knowledge of the exact DNA sequence of these genes for both donor and recipient. Leading transplant centers currently perform testing for all five of these HLA genes before declaring that a donor and recipient are HLA-identical.

Race and ethnicity are known to play a major role in donor recruitment drives, as members of the same ethnic group are more likely to have matching genes, including the genes for HLA.

As of 2013, at least two commercialized allogeneic cell therapies have been developed, Prochymal and Cartistem. Omidubicel was approved for medical use in the United States in April 2023.

== Sources and storage of cells ==
To limit the risks of transplanted stem-cell rejection or of severe graft-versus-host disease in allogeneic HSCT, the donor should preferably have the same HLA-typing as the recipient. About 25 to 30% of allogeneic HSCT recipients have an HLA-identical sibling. Even so-called "perfect matches" may have mismatched minor alleles that contribute to graft-versus-host disease. With recent advances in T-cell-depleting therapies such as post-transplant cyclophosphamide, haploidentical (half-matched) transplants have permitted successful transplantation of many patients who would otherwise have lacked a donor.

=== Bone marrow ===
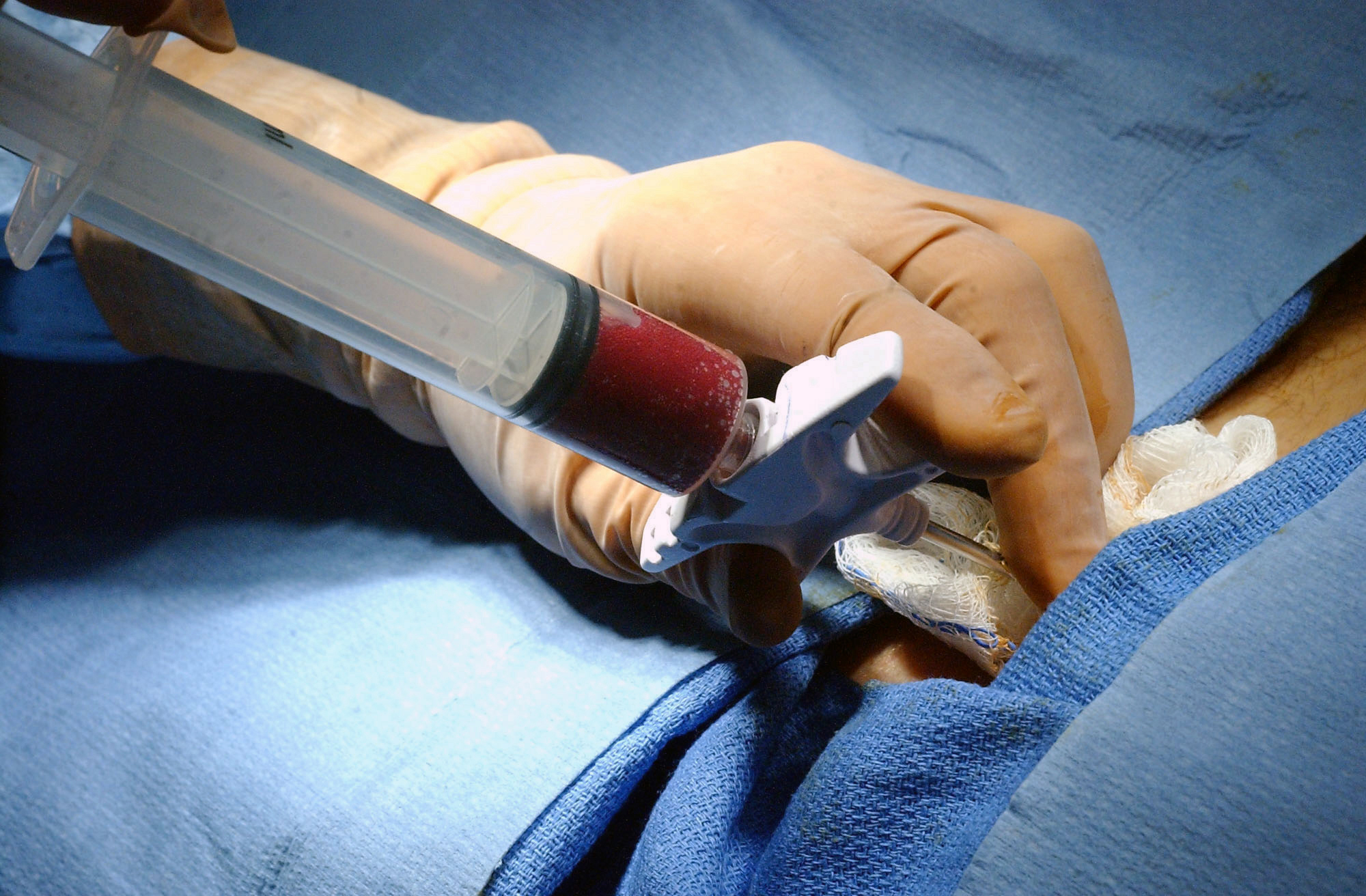
Bone marrow harvest

In the case of a bone-marrow transplant, the HSCs are removed from a large bone of the donor, typically the pelvis, through a large needle that reaches the center of the bone. The technique is referred to as a bone-marrow harvest and is performed under local or general anesthesia.

=== Peripheral blood stem cells ===
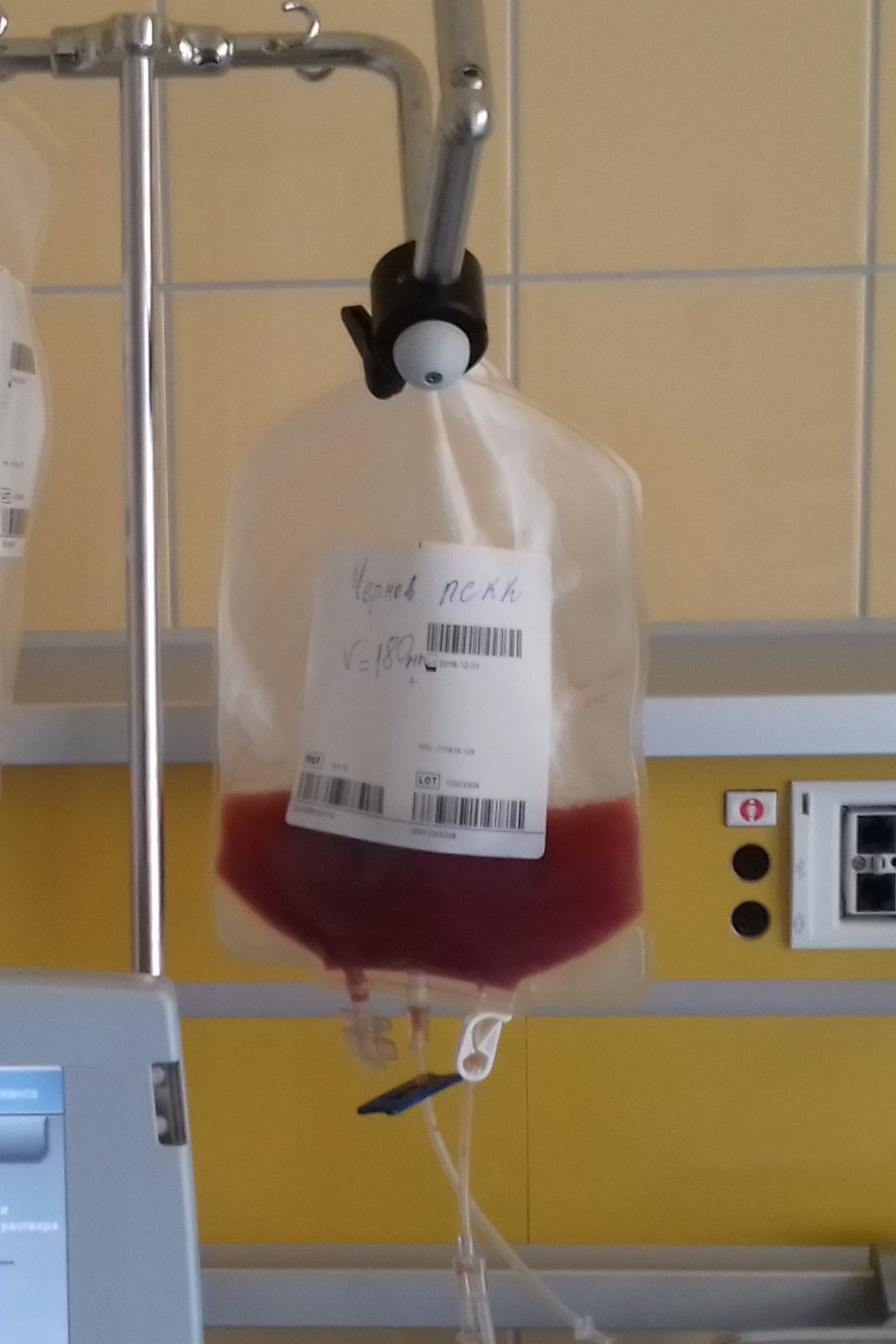
Peripheral blood stem cells

Peripheral blood stem cells are now the most common source of stem cells for HSCT. They are collected from the blood through a process known as apheresis. The donor's blood is withdrawn through a sterile needle in one arm and passed through a machine that removes white blood cells. The red blood cells are returned to the donor. The peripheral stem cell yield is boosted with daily subcutaneous injections of granulocyte-colony stimulating factor, serving to mobilize stem cells from the donor's bone marrow into the peripheral circulation.

=== Amniotic fluid ===
Extracting stem cells from amniotic fluid is possible and may have applications for autologous and heterologous use.

=== Storage of HSC ===
Unlike other organs, bone-marrow cells can be frozen (cryopreserved) for prolonged periods without damaging too many cells. This is a necessity with autologous HSCs because the cells must be harvested from the recipient months in advance of the transplant treatment. In the case of allogeneic transplants, fresh HSCs are preferred to avoid cell loss that might occur during the freezing and thawing process. Allogeneic cord blood is stored frozen at a cord blood bank because it is only obtainable at the time of childbirth. To cryopreserve HSCs, a preservative, dimethyl sulfoxide, must be added, and the cells must be cooled very slowly in a controlled-rate freezer to prevent osmotic cellular injury during ice-crystal formation. HSCs may be stored for years in a cryofreezer, which typically uses liquid nitrogen.

== Conditioning regimens ==
=== Myeloablative ===
The chemotherapy or irradiation given immediately prior to a transplant is called the conditioning regimen, the purpose of which is to help eradicate the patient's disease prior to the infusion of HSCs and to suppress immune reactions. The bone marrow can be ablated (destroyed) with dose-levels that cause minimal injury to other tissues. In allogeneic transplants, a combination of cyclophosphamide with total body irradiation is conventionally employed. This treatment also has an immunosuppressive effect that prevents rejection of the HSCs by the recipient's immune system. The post-transplant prognosis often includes acute and chronic graft-versus-host disease that may be life-threatening. In certain leukemias, though, this can coincide with protection against cancer relapse owing to the graft-versus-tumor effect. Autologous transplants may also use similar conditioning regimens, but many other chemotherapy combinations can be used depending on the type of disease.

=== Nonmyeloablative ===
A newer treatment approach, nonmyeloablative allogeneic transplantation, also termed reduced-intensity conditioning (RIC), uses doses of chemotherapy and radiation too low to eradicate all the bone-marrow cells of the recipient. Instead, nonmyeloablative transplants run lower risks of serious infections and transplant-related mortality while relying upon the graft versus tumor effect to resist the inherent increased risk of cancer relapse. Also significantly, while requiring high doses of immunosuppressive agents in the early stages of treatment, these doses are less than for conventional transplants. This leads to a state of mixed chimerism early after transplant where both recipient and donor HSC coexist in the bone marrow space.

Decreasing doses of immunosuppressive therapy then allow donor T-cells to eradicate the remaining recipient HSCs and to induce the graft-versus-tumor effect. This effect is often accompanied by mild graft-versus-host disease, the appearance of which is often a surrogate marker for the emergence of the desirable graft versus tumor effect, and also serves as a signal to establish an appropriate dosage level for sustained treatment with low levels of immunosuppressive agents.

Because of their gentler conditioning regimens, these transplants are associated with a lower risk of transplant-related mortality, so allow patients who are considered too high-risk for conventional allogeneic HSCT to undergo potentially curative therapy for their disease. The optimal conditioning strategy for each disease and recipient has not been fully established, but RIC can be used in elderly patients unfit for myeloablative regimens, for whom a higher risk of cancer relapse may be acceptable.

== Engraftment ==
After several weeks of growth in the bone marrow, expansion of HSCs and their progeny is sufficient to normalize the blood cell counts and reinitiate the immune system. The offspring of donor-derived HSCs have been documented to populate many different organs of the recipient, including the heart, liver, and muscle, and these cells had been suggested to have the abilities of regenerating injured tissue in these organs. However, recent research has shown that such lineage infidelity does not occur as a normal phenomenon.

Chimerism monitoring is a method to monitor the balance between the patient's own stem cells and the new stem cells from a donor. In allogeneic transplant cases where the patient's own stem cells are increasing in number after treatment, the treatment may potentially not have worked as intended.

== Complications ==
HSCT is associated with a high treatment-related mortality in the recipient, which limits its use to conditions that are themselves life-threatening. (The one-year survival rate has been estimated to be roughly 60%, although this figure includes deaths from the underlying disease, as well as from the transplant procedure.) Major complications include veno-occlusive disease, mucositis, infections (sepsis), graft-versus-host disease, and the development of new malignancies.

=== Infection ===
Bone-marrow transplantation usually requires that the recipient's own bone marrow be destroyed (myeloablation). Prior to the administration of new cells (engraftment), patients may go for several weeks without appreciable numbers of white blood cells to help fight infection. This puts a patient at high risk of infections, sepsis, and septic shock, despite prophylactic antibiotics. Early and thorough dental evaluation and treatment prior to transplantation has been shown to play a critical role in reducing the risk of oral and systemic infections during the neutropenic phase. Antiviral medications, such as acyclovir and valacyclovir, are quite effective in prevention of HSCT-related outbreak of herpetic infection in seropositive patients. Letermovir, a newer antiviral, effectively prevents clinically significant CMV after HSCT, though subclinical reactivation is common, with steroid exposure being the strongest risk factor. The immunosuppressive agents employed in allogeneic transplants for the prevention or treatment of graft-versus-host disease further increase the risk of opportunistic infection. Immunosuppressive drugs are given for a minimum of six months after a transplantation, or much longer if required for the treatment of graft-versus-host disease. Transplant patients lose their acquired immunity, for example immunity to childhood diseases such as measles or polio. So, transplant patients must be retreated with childhood vaccines once they are off immunosuppressive medications.

=== Veno-occlusive disease ===
Severe liver injury can result from hepatic veno-occlusive disease (VOD), newly termed sinusoidal obstruction syndrome (SOS). Elevated levels of bilirubin, hepatomegaly, and fluid retention are clinical hallmarks of this condition. The appreciation of the generalized cellular injury and obstruction in hepatic vein sinuses is now greater. Severe cases of SOS are associated with a high mortality rate. Anticoagulants or defibrotide may be effective in reducing the severity of VOD but may also increase bleeding complications. Ursodiol has been shown to help prevent VOD, presumably by facilitating the flow of bile.

=== Mucositis ===
The injury of the mucosal lining of the mouth and throat is a common regimen-related toxicity following ablative HSCT regimens. It is usually not life-threatening, but is very painful, and prevents eating and drinking. Mucositis is treated with pain medications plus intravenous infusions to prevent dehydration and malnutrition.

=== Hemorrhagic cystitis ===
The mucosal lining of the bladder is affected in about 5% of children undergoing HSCT. This causes hematuria (blood in urine), frequent urination, abdominal pain and thrombocytopenia.

=== Graft-versus-host disease ===
Graft-versus-host disease (GvHD) is an inflammatory disease that is unique to allogeneic transplantation. It is an attack by the "new" bone marrow's immune cells against the recipient's tissues. This can occur even if the donor and recipient are HLA-identical because the immune system can still recognize other differences between their tissues. It is named graft-versus-host disease because the transplanted cells must accept the body rather than the body accepting the new cells.

Acute GvHD typically occurs in the first three months after transplantation and may involve the skin, intestine, or liver. High-dose corticosteroids, such as prednisone, are a standard treatment, but this immunosuppressive treatment often leads to deadly infections. Chronic GvHD may also develop after allogeneic transplant. It is the major source of late treatment-related complications, although it less often results in death. In addition to inflammation, chronic GvHD may lead to the development of fibrosis, or scar tissue, similar to scleroderma; it may cause functional disability and require prolonged immunosuppressive therapy. GvHD is usually mediated by T cells, which react to foreign peptides presented on the major histocompatibility complex of the host.

Further research is needed to determine whether mesenchymal stromal cells can be use for prophylaxis and treatment of GvHD.

=== Graft-versus-tumor effect ===
Graft-versus-tumor effect (GVT), or "graft versus leukemia" effect, is the beneficial aspect of the GvHD phenomenon. For example, HSCT patients with either acute, or in particular chronic, GvHD after an allogeneic transplant tend to have a lower risk of cancer relapse. This is due to a therapeutic immune reaction of the grafted donor T lymphocytes against the diseased bone marrow of the recipient. This lower rate of relapse accounts for the increased success rate of allogeneic transplants, compared to transplants from identical twins, and indicates that allogeneic HSCT is a form of immunotherapy.

Graft versus tumor is mainly beneficial in diseases with slow progress, e.g. chronic leukemia, low-grade lymphoma, and in some cases multiple myeloma, but is less effective in rapidly growing acute leukemias.

If cancer relapses after HSCT, infusing the patient with a greater quantity of donor white blood cells (donor lymphocyte infusion) can help to increase the GvL effect and boost the new immune system's response. However, if this does not help clear the remaining cancer, a second transplant is sometimes given.

=== Malignancies ===
Patients after HSCT are at a higher risk for oral carcinoma. Post-HSCT oral cancer may have more aggressive behavior with poorer prognosis, when compared to oral cancer in non-HSCT patients.

A meta-analysis showed that the risk of secondary cancers such as bone cancer, head and neck cancers, and melanoma, with standardized incidence ratios of 10.04 (3.48–16.61), 6.35 (4.76–7.93), and 3.52 (2.65–4.39), respectively, was significantly increased after HSCT. So, diagnostic tests for these cancers should be included in the screening program of these patients for the prevention and early detection of these cancers.

=== Graft failure ===
Graft failure is a rare but critical complication of a stem cell transplant where the infused donor stem cells fail to produce functional cells in the patient's bone marrow.

This is categorised into two types:

- Primary graft failure: Where donor cells never successfully take root in the bone marrow. This is indicated by failure to achieve count recovery.
- Secondary graft failure: Where donor cells initially engraft but later disappear, causing a complete loss of donor chimerism.

Higher risk of graft failure is associated with HLA-mismatched donor cells. Mismatched unrelated donors, haploidentical donors, and umbilical cord blood grafts have historically been associated with higher rates of graft failure than HLA-matched sibling donors, owing to greater immunological disparity and, in the case of umbilical cord blood, the lower number of transplanted stem cells, which can delay or impair engraftment.

== Prognosis ==
Prognosis in HSCT varies widely dependent upon disease type, stage, stem-cell source, HLA-matched status (for allogeneic HSCT), and conditioning regimen. A transplant offers a chance for cure or long-term remission if the inherent complications of graft versus host disease, immunosuppressive treatments and the spectrum of opportunistic infections can be survived. In recent years, survival rates have been gradually improving across almost all populations and subpopulations receiving transplants.

Mortality for allogeneic stem cell transplantation can be estimated using the prediction model created by Sorror et al., using the Hematopoietic Cell Transplantation-Specific Comorbidity Index (HCT-CI). The HCT-CI was derived and validated by investigators at the Fred Hutchinson Cancer Research Center in the U.S. The HCT-CI modifies and adds to a well-validated comorbidity index, the Charlson Comorbidity Index (CCI) (Charlson, et al.) The CCI was previously applied to patients undergoing allogeneic HCT, but appears to provide less survival prediction and discrimination than the HCT-CI scoring system.

Patients who were successfully treated with HSCT and total body irradiation in childhood were found to have increased fat mass percentage, leading to significantly decreased exercise capacity in adulthood. This suggests patients who underwent successful treatment with HSCT have an increased predisposition to cardiovascular disease later in life.

== Risks to donor ==
The risks of a complication depend on patient characteristics, health care providers, and the apheresis procedure, and the colony-stimulating factor used (G-CSF). G-CSF drugs include filgrastim (Neupogen, Neulasta), and lenograstim (Graslopin).

=== Drug risks ===
Filgrastim is typically dosed in the 10 microgram/kg level for 4–5 days during the harvesting of stem cells. The documented adverse effects of filgrastim include splenic rupture, acute respiratory distress syndrome, alveolar hemorrhage, and allergic reactions (usually experienced in first 30 minutes). In addition, platelet and hemoglobin levels dip postprocedurally, not returning to normal until after a month.

The question of whether geriatrics (patients over 65) react the same as patients under 65 has not been sufficiently examined. Coagulation issues and inflammation of atherosclerotic plaques are known to occur as a result of G-CSF injection. G-CSF has also been described to induce genetic changes in agranulocytes of normal donors. There is no statistically significant evidence either for or against the hypothesis that myelodysplasia (MDS) or acute myeloid leukaemia (AML) can be induced by G-CSF in susceptible individuals.

=== Access risks ===
Blood is drawn from a peripheral vein in a majority of patients, but a central line to the jugular, subclavian, and femoral veins may be used. Adverse reactions during apheresis were experienced in 20% of women and 8% of men, these adverse events primarily consisted of numbness/tingling, multiple line attempts, and nausea.

=== Clinical observations ===
A study involving 2,408 donors (aged 18–60 years) indicated that bone pain (primarily back and hips) as a result of filgrastim treatment is observed in 80% of donors. Donation is not recommended for those with a history of back pain. Other symptoms observed in more than 40 percent of donors include muscle pain, headache, fatigue, and difficulty sleeping. These symptoms all returned to baseline 1 month after donation in the majority of patients.

In one meta-study that incorporated data from 377 donors, 44% of patients reported having adverse side effects after peripheral blood HSCT. Side effects included pain prior to the collection procedure as a result of G-CSF injections, and postprocedural generalized skeletal pain, fatigue, and reduced energy.

=== Severe reactions ===
A study that surveyed 2,408 donors found that serious adverse events (requiring prolonged hospitalization) occurred in 15 donors (at a rate of 0.6%), although none of these events was fatal. Donors were not observed to have higher than normal rates of cancer with up to 4–8 years of follow-up. One study based on a survey of medical teams covered about 24,000 peripheral blood HSCT cases between 1993 and 2005, and found a serious cardiovascular adverse reaction rate of about one in 1,500. This study reported a cardiovascular-related fatality risk within the first 30 days of HSCT of about two in 10,000.

== History ==
In 1939, a woman with aplastic anaemia received the first human bone marrow transfusion. This patient received regular blood transfusions, and an attempt was made to increase her leukocyte and platelet counts by intravenous bone marrow injection without unexpected reaction.

Stem-cell transplantation was pioneered using bone marrow-derived stem cells by a team at the Fred Hutchinson Cancer Research Center from the 1950s through the 1970s led by E. Donnall Thomas, whose work was later recognized with a Nobel Prize in Physiology or Medicine. Thomas' work showed that bone-marrow cells infused intravenously could repopulate the bone marrow and produce new blood cells. His work also reduced the likelihood of developing a life-threatening graft-versus-host disease. Collaborating with Eloise Giblett, a professor at the University of Washington, he discovered genetic markers that could confirm donor matches.

The very first successful bone marrow transplants were performed in 1958 by Georges Mathé, then assistant to Jean Bernard at the Hôpital Saint-Louis in Paris, on five Yugoslav physicists accidentally irradiated in a nuclear reactor. Four survived the transplant.

The first physician to perform a successful human bone-marrow transplant on a disease other than cancer was Robert A. Good at the University of Minnesota in 1968. In 1975, John Kersey, also of the University of Minnesota, performed the first successful bone-marrow transplant to cure lymphoma. His patient, a 16-year-old-boy, is today the longest-living lymphoma transplant survivor.

== Donor registration and recruitment ==
At the end of 2012, 20.2 million people had registered their willingness to be a bone-marrow donor with one of the 67 registries from 49 countries participating in Bone Marrow Donors Worldwide. Around 17.9 million of these registered donors had been ABDR typed, allowing easy matching. A further 561,000 cord blood units had been received by one of 46 cord blood banks from 30 countries participating. The highest total number of bone-marrow donors registered were those from the U.S. (8.0 million), and the highest number per capita were those from Cyprus (15.4% of the population).

Within the U.S., racial minority groups are the least likely to be registered, so are the least likely to find a potentially life-saving match. In 1990, only six African Americans were able to find a bone-marrow match, and all six had common European genetic signatures. Africans are more genetically diverse than people of European descent, which means that more registrations are needed to find a match. Bone marrow and cord blood banks exist in South Africa, and a new program is beginning in Nigeria. Many people belonging to different races are requested to donate as a shortage of donors exists in African, mixed race, Latino, aboriginal, and many other communities.

Two registries in the U.S. recruit unrelated allogeneic donors: NMDP or Be the Match, and the Gift of Life Marrow Registry.

== Research ==
=== HIV ===
In 2007, a team of doctors in Berlin, Germany, including Gero Hütter, performed a stem-cell transplant for leukemia patient Timothy Ray Brown, who was also HIV-positive. From 60 matching donors, they selected a [CCR5]-Δ32 homozygous individual with two genetic copies of a rare variant of a cell surface receptor. This genetic trait confers resistance to HIV infection by blocking attachment of HIV to the cell. Roughly one in 1,000 people of European ancestry have this inherited mutation, but it is rarer in other populations. The transplant was repeated a year later after a leukemia relapse. Over three years after the initial transplant, and despite discontinuing antiretroviral therapy, researchers cannot detect HIV in the transplant recipient's blood or in various biopsies of his tissues. Levels of HIV-specific antibodies have also declined, leading to speculation that the patient may have been functionally cured of HIV, but scientists emphasise that this is an unusual case. Potentially fatal transplant complications (the "Berlin patient" developed graft-versus-host disease and leukoencephalopathy) mean that the procedure could not be performed in others with HIV, even if sufficient numbers of suitable donors were found.

In 2012, Daniel Kuritzkes reported results of two stem-cell transplants in patients with HIV. They did not, however, use donors with the Δ32 deletion. After their transplant procedures, both were put on antiretroviral therapies, during which neither showed traces of HIV in their blood plasma and purified CD4^{+} T cells using a sensitive culture method (less than 3 copies/ml). The virus was once again detected in both patients some time after the discontinuation of therapy.

In 2019, a British man became the second to be cleared of HIV after receiving a bone-marrow transplant from a virus-resistant (Δ32) donor. This patient is being called "the London patient" (a reference to the famous Berlin patient).

=== Multiple sclerosis ===
Since McAllister's 1997 report on a patient with multiple sclerosis (MS) who received a bone-marrow transplant for chronic myelogenous leukemia (CML), over 600 reports have been published describing HSCTs performed primarily for MS. These have been shown to "reduce or eliminate ongoing clinical relapses, halt further progression, and reduce the burden of disability in some patients" who have aggressive, highly active MS, "in the absence of chronic treatment with disease-modifying agents". A randomized clinical trial including 110 patients showed that HSCT significantly prolonged time to disease progression compared to disease-modifying therapy. Long-term outcome in patients with severe disease has showed that complete disease remission after HSCT is possible.

== Other autoimmune neurological diseases ==
HSCT can also be used for treating selected, severe cases of other autoimmune neurological diseases such as neuromyelitis optica, chronic inflammatory demyelinating polyneuropathy, and myasthenia gravis.
