= Nikhil Bhogal =

American entrepreneur

Nikhil Bhogal is an entrepreneur, engineer, inventor and the co-founder and CTO of June, maker of the June Intelligent Oven. Previously, he was an engineer at Apple and Path, designing the camera software used on the first five generations of the iPhone.

Bhogal is listed as an inventor on many of Apple's camera software patents; these inventions include the iPhone and iPad's tap-to-focus, continuous image capture, the lock screen camera, and panoramic photography.
