= Cord blood bank =

Facility which stores umbilical cord blood for future use

A cord blood bank is a facility which stores umbilical cord blood for future use. Both private and public cord blood banks have developed in response to the potential for cord blood in treating diseases of the blood and immune systems. Public cord blood banks accept donations to be used for anyone in need, and as such function like public blood banks. Traditionally, public cord blood banking has been more widely accepted by the medical community. Private cord blood banks store cord blood solely for potential use by the donor or donor's family. Private banks typically charge around $2,000 for the collection and around $200 a year for storage.

The policy of the American Academy of Pediatrics states that "private storage of cord blood as 'biological insurance' is unwise" unless there is a family member with a current or potential need to undergo a stem cell transplantation. The American Academy of Pediatrics also notes that the odds of using one's own cord blood is 1 in 200,000 while the National Academy of Medicine says that only 14 such procedures have ever been performed. Private storage of one's own cord blood is unlawful in Italy and France, and it is also discouraged in some other European countries. The American Medical Association states "Private banking should be considered in the unusual circumstance when there exists a family predisposition to a condition in which umbilical cord stem cells are therapeutically indicated. However, because of its cost, limited likelihood of use, and inaccessibility to others, private banking should not be recommended to low-risk families." The American Society for Blood and Marrow Transplantation and the American Congress of Obstetricians and Gynecologists also encourage public cord banking and discourage private cord blood banking. Nearly all cord blood transfusions come from public banks, rather than private banks, partly because most treatable conditions can't use one's own cord blood.

Cord blood contains hematopoietic stem cells (which can differentiate only into blood cells), and should not be confused with embryonic stem cells or pluripotent stem cells, which can differentiate into any cell in the body. Cord blood stem cells are blood cell progenitors which can form red blood cells, white blood cells, and platelets. This is why cord blood cells are currently used to treat blood and immune system related genetic diseases, cancers, and blood disorders. Cord blood is also a source of mesenchymal stem cells, which can further be differentiated to form connective tissues, bones and cartilage. On the possibility that cord blood stem cells could be used for other purposes, the World Marrow Donor Association and European Group on Ethics in Science and New Technologies states "The possibility of using one's own cord blood stem cells for regenerative medicine is currently purely hypothetical....It is therefore highly hypothetical that cord blood cells kept for autologous use will be of any value in the future" and "the legitimacy of commercial cord blood banks for autologous use should be questioned as they sell a service which has presently no real use regarding therapeutic options."

== Regulation ==
=== United States ===
In the United States, the Food and Drug Administration regulates cord blood under the category of "Human Cells, Tissues, and Cellular and Tissue Based-Products." The Code of Federal Regulations under which the FDA regulates public and private cord blood banks is Title 21 Section 1271. Several states also require accreditation, including New York, New Jersey, and California. Any company not accredited within those states are not legally permitted to collect cord blood from those states, even if the company is based out of state. Potential clients can check the New York accreditation status from the New York Umbilical Cord Blood Banks Licensed to Collect in New York. Both public and private cord blood banks are also eligible for voluntary accreditation with either the Association for the Advancement of Blood & Biotherapies (AABB) or the Foundation for the Accreditation of Cellular Therapy (FACT). Potential clients can check the current accreditation status of laboratories from the AABB list of accredited cord blood laboratories or the FACT search engine of accredited cord blood banks (on their home page). Other countries also have regulations pertaining to cord blood.

=== Europe ===
Cord blood banking in Europe is subject to European Union legislation and national regulatory frameworks. Directive 2004/23/EC on tissues and cells, together with its implementing directives, establishes requirements for the collection, testing, processing, preservation and distribution of human tissues and cells, including umbilical cord blood. It covers quality and safety standards, traceability, authorization of establishments and the reporting of adverse events and applies to both public and private cord blood banks in EU member states. National policies differ regarding the availability of cord blood banks and the promotion of public donation. Some countries prioritize public banking for donations intended for use by compatible recipients, others permit private storage for potential family use, both are subject to national regulations.

== Collection and cryopreservation ==
Cord blood collection happens after the umbilical cord has been cut and is extracted from the fetal end of the cord, diverting up to 75 +/- 23 mL from the neonate. It is usually done within ten minutes of giving birth. Additional stem cells may be collected from the placenta. After the health care provider draws the cord blood from the placental end of the umbilical cord, the placenta is couriered to the stem cell laboratory, where it is processed for additional stem cells. An adequate cord blood collection requires at least 75mL in order to ensure that there will be enough cells to be used for a transplantation. Before the cord blood is stored for later use, it undergoes viral testing, including tests for HIV and Hepatitis B and C, and tissue typing to determine Human Leukocyte Antigen type. It will also be examined for nucleated cell count, cell viability, blood group antigen ABO & Rh blood group system, molecule cluster (CD34), and bacterial and fungal growth.

After the collection, the cord blood unit is shipped to the lab and processed, and then cryopreserved. There are many ways to process a cord blood unit, and there are differing opinions on what the best way is. Some processing methods separate out the red blood cells and remove them, while others keep the red blood cells. However the unit is processed, a cryopreservant is added to the cord blood to allow the cells to survive the cryogenic process. After the unit is slowly cooled to −90 °C, it can then be added to a liquid nitrogen tank which will keep the cord blood unit frozen at −196 °C. The slow freezing process is important to keep the cells alive during the freezing process. There is no consensus yet on optimal procedures for these cord blood cells, although many cryopreservation strategies suggest using dimethyl sulfoxide (DMSO), slow or controlled rate cooling, and rapid thawing.

Cord blood stem cells (though usually from donors) are currently used in the treatment of several life-threatening conditions, mainly blood and immune system related genetic diseases, cancers, and blood disorders. The first clinically documented use of cord blood stem cells was in the successful treatment of a six-year-old boy afflicted by Fanconi anemia in 1988. For two decades after that, cord blood became increasingly recognized as a source of stem cells that can be used in stem cell therapy. Subsequently, with the arrival of newer techniques such as haploidentical transplantation, there has been a trend away from cord blood as the stem cell source.

== Public banks ==
Public cord blood banks function like public blood banks, in that they accept donations from anyone, discard donations that fail to meet various quality control standards, and use national registries to find recipients for their samples. Since patients who need cord blood frequently need more cells than a single collection would have provided, public banks frequently combined multiple samples together when preparing the treatment for a single patient. Before the advent of haploidentical bone marrow transplantation, cord blood's lack of requirement for an exact genetic match made it easier to provide patients samples from unrelated donors. The percentage of public bank donations discarded as medical waste is often cited to be between 60 and 80%. Some of this is due to contamination that occasionally occurs during collection or complications arising from shipping, though this is mostly due to the fact that most cord blood collections fail to collect enough usable cells. Because matches are almost always likely to be better in a public than a private bank, and cord blood from public banks doesn't suffer from the problems it commonly suffers from at private banks (such as potential lower quality control and lower medical usefulness of using a patient's own potentially diseased cord blood), public cord blood banking has been more widely accepted by the medical community. One important obstacle facing public banks is the high cost required to maintain them, which has prevented more than a handful from opening. Because public banks do not charge storage fees, medical centers do not always have the funds required to establish and maintain them.

A recent large study by the journal Pediatrics concluded that almost all cord blood transplants come from public banks:

In the Pediatrics study, transplant specialists who collectively have performed thousands of stem cell transplants for childhood leukemia and other illnesses report that only 50 involved privately banked blood. (Support for public cord-blood banking is widespread in the medical community.) Forty-one cases involved blood used to treat a family member, often a sibling; in 36 of those cases the need for a transplant was known before the cord blood was collected. Only nine cases involved giving cord blood back to the donor, a practice known as autologous transplantation and the chief selling point for private cord-blood banking.

== Private banks ==
Private banking is typically costly to parents and not covered by insurance. The ability to use the cord blood may also depend on the long-term commercial viability of the enterprise. Accordingly, whether cord blood banking is a worthwhile expenditure for the expectant parent depends in part upon whether the expenditure is offset by the likelihood of ultimately using the cord blood and by the benefits of such use. It is important to ensure the credentials of any potential private bank. In the United States, the Food and Drug Administration regulates cord blood under the category of "Human Cells, Tissues, and Cellular and Tissue Based-Products". Since the FDA considers cord blood stored at public banks to be "drugs", but doesn't consider cord blood stored at private banks for use by the donor to be drugs, private banks are held to a less stringent regulatory standard.

Historically, cord blood transplants required less stringent matching between the tissue types of the donor and patient, known as their human leukocyte antigen (HLA) types. Bone marrow transplants required a complete match on six key antigens, to decrease the chance of graft-versus-host disease, known as a 6/6 match. Cord blood transplants achieved the same medical success with only a 4/6 match. HLA type is inherited from both parents, so siblings are particularly likely to be a match, and people from the same ethnic heritage are more likely to match. Minority ethnic groups have difficulty finding a perfectly matched transplant donor. Allogeneic transplants have traditionally had a better outcome when the donor and patient are related, because then the minor antigens also match. The odds that two siblings will have a 6/6 match, for a matched related bone marrow transplant, are 25%. Now that new techniques for haploidentical stem cell transplantation have greatly improved success rates, the requirement for a matched donor is much less of a barrier to transplant. Most families can provide a haploidentical donor.

The policy of the Society of Obstetricians and Gynaecologists of Canada (SOGC) supports public cord blood banking (similar to the collection and banking of other blood products, i.e. altruistic, anyone can use it), as well as stating that it should only be considered under certain circumstances. The policy of the American Academy of Pediatrics states that "private storage of cord blood as 'biological insurance' is unwise" unless there is a family member with a current or potential need to undergo a stem cell transplantation. Private storage of one's own cord blood is unlawful in Italy and France, and it is also discouraged in some other European countries.

The American Society for Blood and Marrow Transplantation states that public donation of cord blood is encouraged where possible, the probability of using one's own cord blood is very small, and therefore storage of cord blood for personal use is not recommended, and family member banking (collecting and storing cord blood for a family member) is recommended when there is a sibling with a disease that may be treated successfully with an allogeneic transplant.

== Ownership of cord blood ==
Umbilical cord blood in humans contains the cells and DNA of the baby. However, consent of the mother alone is usually obtained for collection, and the consent of the father is rarely considered.

As of 2007, contracts of the largest cord blood banks do not explicitly state that the cord blood belongs to the donors and child with all the rights and privileges one would reasonably expect from ownership. The ambiguity leaves open future uses not approved by the donors and child. At the majority of private cord blood banking facilities, the mother owns all rights to the cord blood that was banked, until the minor in which the cord blood was taken turns eighteen. At that time the minor has all rights to his or her own banked cord blood.

Concerns have been raised that the current interest in cord blood could cause a perception that cord blood is "unused" by the birth process, thus decreasing the amount of blood which is infused into the child as part of the birth process. The pulsation of the cord pushes blood into the child, and it has been recommended that the cord cease pulsation prior to clamping. With the demand for cord blood increasing, there is a possibility that the cord could be clamped prematurely to preserve even more "extra" cord blood. The American Academy of Pediatricians notes: "if cord clamping is done too soon after birth, the infant may be deprived of a placental blood transfusion, resulting in lower blood volume and increased risk for anemia."

== Safety and effectiveness ==
Using one's own cord blood cells might not be wise or effective, especially in cases of childhood cancers and leukemia. Children who develop an immunological disorder often are unable to use their own cord blood for transplant because the blood also contains the same genetic defect.

Additional issues include the possible contamination of the cord blood unit with the same cancer diagnosed later in life; for example, abnormal cells have been detected in filters containing newborn blood of children who were not diagnosed with acute leukemia until the age of 2 to 6 years. The high relapse rates after autologous or syngeneic transplant and the benefit of a graft-vs.-leukemia effect of an allogeneic transplant suggest that autologous cord blood would not be the ideal source of stem cells for patients with leukemia needing a transplant.

In 2024, the New York Times described problems with microbial contamination as well as low-volume samples that did not have adequate stem cell counts.

== Confusion with embryonic stem cells ==
The public in the United States has a general awareness of embryonic stem cells because of the stem cell controversy. However, cord blood stem cells (hematopoietic stem cells) are not embryonic stem cells (pluripotent stem cells).

== See also ==
- Cryo-Cell International
