= Jay Feinberg =

American not-for-profit executive

Jay Feinberg Lh.D, hc
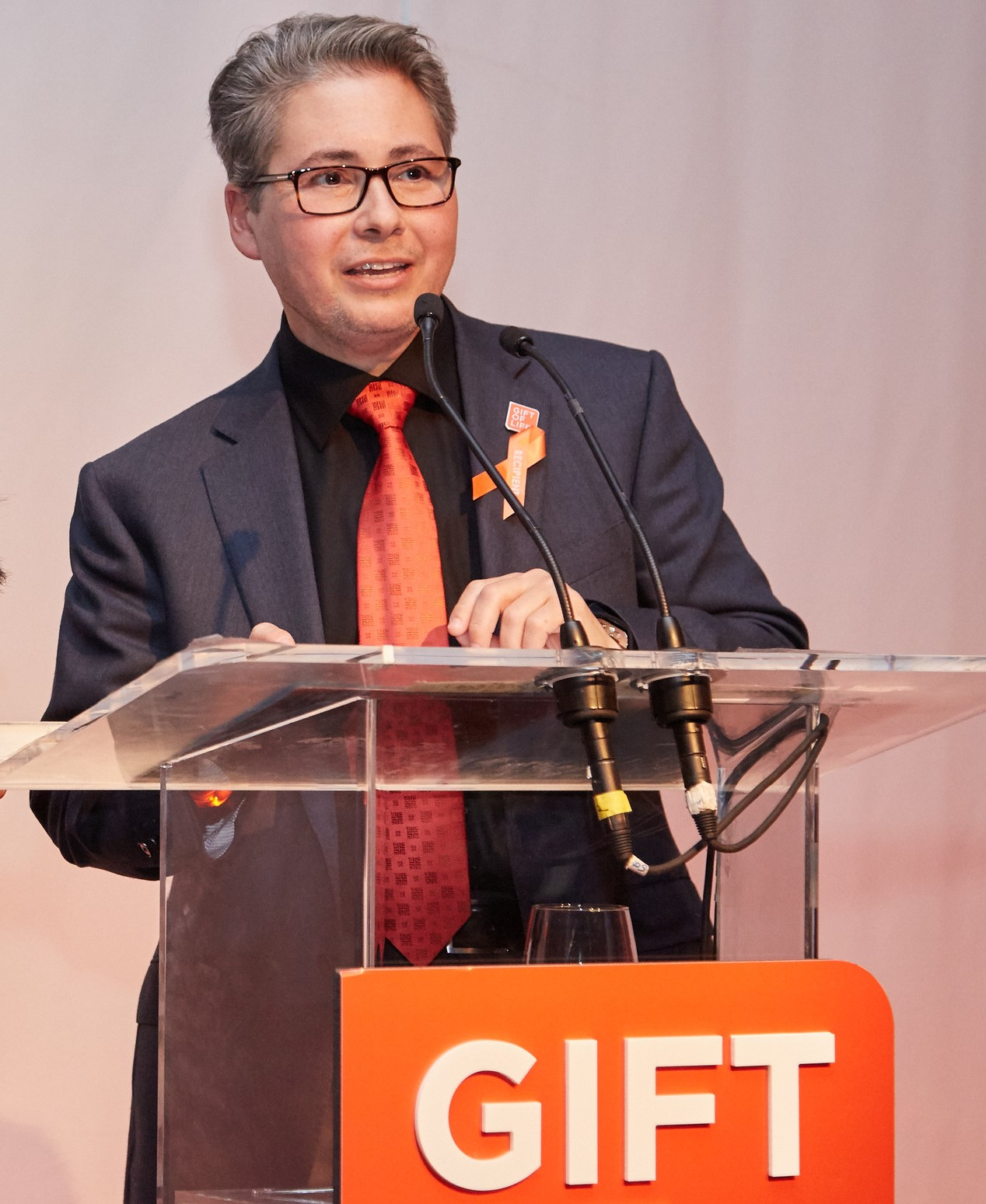
- Born: Nyack, New York
- Education: Dickinson College
- Occupations: Bone Marrow Registry Founder and CEO
- Board member of: Gift of Life Marrow Registry

Jay Feinberg (born August 1968 in New York City) is a long-term leukemia survivor, community organizer and founder and current CEO of the Gift of Life Marrow Registry.

== Leukemia, and search for a donor ==
Raised in West Orange, New Jersey, Feinberg graduated in 1986 from Saddle River Day School and in 1990 from Dickinson College (Carlisle, PA). He was a 22-year-old foreign-exchange analyst for the Federal Reserve Bank of New York in 1991, just starting law school when he was diagnosed with leukemia and told that a bone marrow transplant was his only hope. A matching donor was not found in Feinberg's immediate family. Knowing that tissue type is influenced by one's ethnic background - inherited like eye color, his friends and relatives widened their search to the unrelated population, focusing on increasing the representation of Ashkenazi Jews.

Feinberg's plight, along with that of Mario Cooper, a graphic design artist, and Erskine Henderson, an attorney at Skadden Arps, was featured in a 1991 article in The New York Times. Massive screenings were organized in Jewish communities throughout North America and Israel. In addition, screenings were held in Belarus (by Arnie Draiman and Bill Begal), Australia and South Africa.

By 1995, more than 55,000 people had been tested. Feinberg's condition was rapidly deteriorating and only a partial match had been found. A friend in Milwaukee organized one last drive and teenager Becky Faibisoff, a 16-year-old girl from Illinois, was found to be a match. Feinberg received his successful transplant at the Fred Hutchinson Cancer Research Center in Seattle, WA.

== The Gift of Life Marrow Registry ==
Feinberg is the founder and CEO of the Gift of Life Marrow Registry which seeks to increase ethnic diversity in the global donor pool to increase the chances patients will find a genetic match. The recruitment model Feinberg created for increasing the representation of Jewish donors in the registry during his own donor search has since been replicated to help increase representation of donors of African America, Hispanic, Asian and Native American backgrounds.

Feinberg helped the organization to become a world leader in its field.

== World Marrow Donor Association ==
In 2024, Feinberg was elected President of the World Marrow Donor Association. He assumed office on January 1, 2025.

== Awards ==
- In 1999, Feinberg was awarded the Hadassah International’s Citizen of the World Award.
- In 2005, he was awarded an honorary doctorate by Yeshiva University, along with Senator Hillary Rodham Clinton
- In 2010, he was awarded the Jewish Community Hero Award for his inspiring service to both the Jewish community and all those in need of bone marrow transplants by Jewish Federations of North America.
- In 2013, Feinberg was named one of the top one hundred individuals who have positively influenced Jewish life this past year for innovation by The Algemeiner Jewish 100.
- In late 2013, Feinberg received the prestigious Eisendrath Bearer of Light Award, the highest honor bestowed by the Reform Movement.
- In 2016, Feinberg was awarded the Community Leadership Award at Areyvut’s Fifth Annual Bergen County Breakfast for his service and leadership.
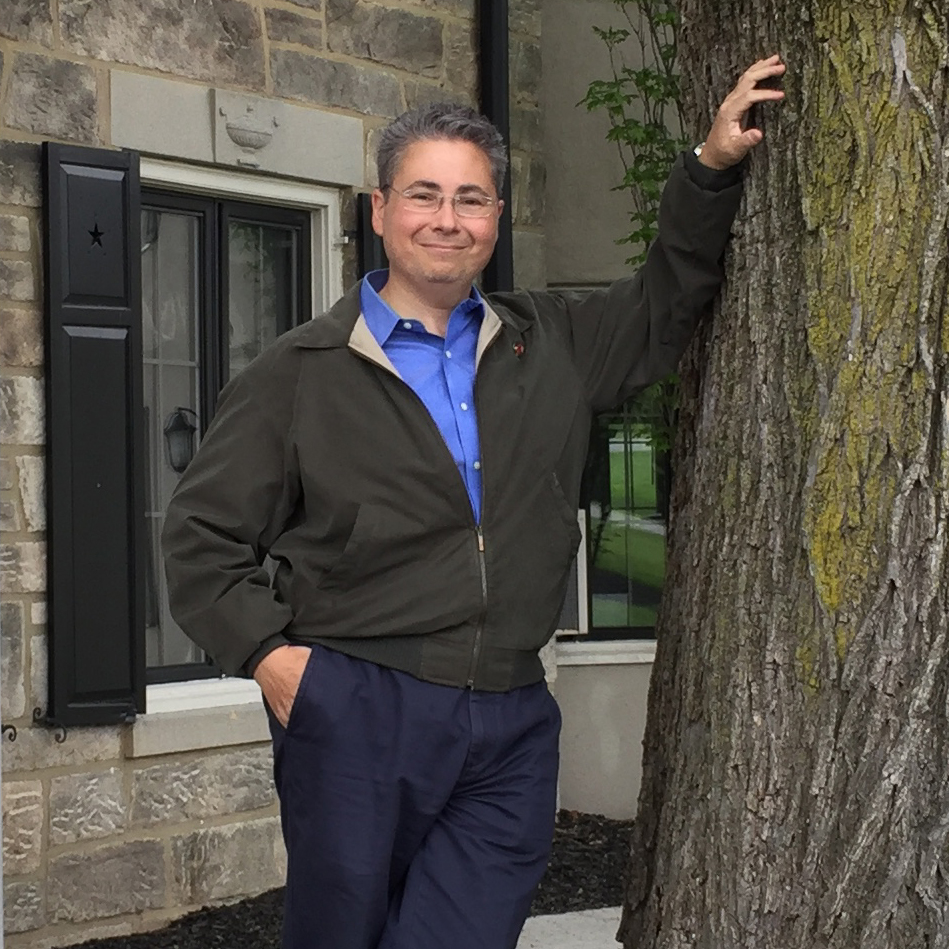
Jay Feinberg, 2016
