= Bandra (film) =

2023 film by Arun Gopy

- Theatrical release poster
- Directed by: Arun Gopy
- Written by: Udaykrishna
- Produced by: Vinayaka Ajith
- Starring: Dileep; Tamannaah Bhatia; Dino Morea; Mamta Mohandas; Kalabhavan Shajohn; R. Sarathkumar
- Cinematography: Shaji Kumar
- Edited by: Vivek Harshan
- Music by: Sam C. S.
- Production company: Ajith Vinayaka Films
- Distributed by: Ajith Vinayaka Release
- Release date: 10 November 2023
- Running time: 156 minutes
- Country: India
- Language: Malayalam
- Budget: ₹35 crore
- Box office: ₹6 crore

Bandra is a 2023 Indian Malayalam-language romantic drama gangster film directed by Arun Gopy, written by Udaykrishna, and produced by Vinayaka Ajith. The film stars Dileep and Tamannaah Bhatia (in her Malayalam debut), alongside Dino Morea, Mamta Mohandas, Kalabhavan Shajohn, R. Sarathkumar, Lena, Easwari Rao, K. B. Ganesh Kumar, Siddique, and VTV Ganesh. The film's original score was composed by Sam C. S., while the cinematography and editing were handled by Shaji Kumar and Vivek Harshan, respectively.

Bandra was released in theatres on 10 November 2023 during the Diwali holiday. The film received negative reviews from critics and underperformed at the box office.

== Plot ==
A budding filmmaker named Sakshi is eager to find inspiration for her debut movie. She fails to impress a male star with her script. Soon after, her car gets struck by an old man's scooter. That day, while sipping coffee at a restaurant, she notices that it faces the infamous Tulsi Apartment, the place from which a 90s Bollywood icon, Tara Janaki, jumped to her death in 1993. Intrigued, Sakshi decides to make a film about Tara's life. As she begins investigating, she comes across a photo album from Tara's last movie and spots a man named Mirchi, who turns out to be the same man who had hit her car earlier. Sakshi follows Mirchi, and eventually, he reveals the true story of Tara Janaki.

As the story unfolds, the actress has sought refuge in the house of the very prosperous Alexander "Aala" Dominic at the start of a shoot in Kerala. He was already besotted by her after a momentary glance of her beauty on the big screen when he had gone to the theatre to catch a goon.

Thara tells Aala that she wants to escape her controlling adoptive mother, Hema Janaki, and the RD company owner, Ragavendra Desai, who is producing her films. While the Kerala police are looking for the missing actress from the sets, she is having a relaxing time surrounded by the love of Aala's entourage, which includes his mother. However, soon, the game is up, and both Hema and Desai take her back to Mumbai.

Thara finishes the last film on her contract with Desai, but he nixes her chances on new projects. Aala, who has now followed Thara to Mumbai, suggests that she produce her next film: the woman-centric story of Rani Padmini.

To finance the project, Aala, who has a vaguely-referred-to shady past, commits crimes in the contract of a former anti-terrorist squad officer IG Veera Raghavan IPS, who wanted to avenge the killing of his family. Aala's contract also includes resolving the matter of Desai. Sakshi finally learns from Mirchi that Thara's death was not a suicide; she was actually killed by Desai. Aala gets enraged and brutally kills Desai to avenge Thara's death.

Sakshi completes the film and releases the movie titled BANDRA in the theatres. She receives an unknown call. The caller is Aala, who is now in Kazakhstan, and tells Sakshi that the story does not end here, the story of 30 years remains untold.

== Cast ==
- Dileep as Alan Alexander "Aala" Dominic, a dreaded gangster in Mumbai
- Tamannaah Bhatia as Tara Janaki (Diana), the Bollywood actress and Alan's love interest
- Dino Morea as Raghavendra Desai, the don film producer
- Mamta Mohandas as Sakshi, an aspiring filmmaker
- Kalabhavan Shajohn as Mirchi, Alan's best friend
- R. Sarathkumar as Veera Raghavan IPS
- Lenaa as Hemaji, Tara Janaki’s adopted mother
- Easwari Rao as Rosamma, Alan’s mother
- K. B. Ganesh Kumar as Babukka
- Siddique as SP Stanley IPS
- VTV Ganesh as Goswamy
- Rajveer Ankur Singh as Bala
- Darasing Khurana as Munna
- Amit Tiwari as Rashid Khan
- Rejoice as Rejoice
- G. Suresh Kumar as Sarath Kumar
- Suresh Chandra Menon as Rajeev Kumar
- Ubaidulla as Rarichan
- Sundar Raj as Santhanam
- Aryan Santhosh as ACP Sanjay Bhatt
- Anjana Appukuttan as Sudha
- Bindu Sanjeev as Kausalya
- Gautam Rode as Arjun Pandey
- Sarath Sabha as Paulo
- Diya Deepan as Veera Raghavan’s daughter
- Saniya Rafi as Veera Raghavan’s daughter

Cameo appearance

- Amika Shail as Bar Dancer (Mujhe Paale)
- Chemban Vinod Jose as John, Alan's henchman
- Shine Tom Chacko as Akbar, Alan's henchman

== Production ==
=== Development ===
Bandra serves as Dileep's 147th film; hence, the film had the working title D147. This film marks Tamannaah Bhatia's debut in the Malayalam film industry. According to Arun Gopy, although the film's story is fictional, it was inspired by a true incident.

=== Filming ===
Principal photography began on 1 September 2022 with a pooja ceremony held at the Kottarakkara Ganapathy Temple. The first schedule was completed in December in Rajasthan. After completing a two-day shoot of Jailer in Hyderabad, Tamannaah joined the second schedule on 20 January 2023 in Kochi. The filming locations included Ahmedabad, Siddhapur, Rajkot, Gondal, Jaipur, Mumbai and Hyderabad. The post-credit scenes were shot in Russia in April. Filming wrapped up on 14 September 2023. The stunt choreographer was Anbariv. The film was reportedly made on a budget of over ₹30 crore.

== Music ==
Bandra

Soundtrack album by Sam C. S.
- Released: 29 November 2023
- Recorded: 2023
- Genre: Film soundtrack
- Length: 18:28
- Language: Malayalam
- Label: Saregama

Sam C. S. chronology
Raid (2023)	Bandra (2023)	Vela (2023)
External audio
- Bandra (Official Audio Jukebox) on YouTube

Singles from Bandra
- 1. "Rakka Rakka" Released: 31 October 2023; 2. "Vaarmeghame" Released: 7 November 2023; 3. "Otta Kolakombanaada" Released: 11 November 2023; 4. "Mujhe Paale" Released: 16 November 2023

The film's musical score is composed by Sam C. S. The audio rights were acquired by Saregama. The first single, titled "Rakka Rakka", was released on 31 October 2023. The second single, titled "Vaarmeghame", was released on 7 November 2023. The third single, titled "Otta Kolakombanaada", was released on 11 November 2023. The fourth single, titled "Mujhe Paale", was released on 16 November 2023. The entire album featuring 5 tracks was released on 29 November 2023.

All music is composed by Sam C. S.

Track listing
No.	Title	Lyrics	Singer(s)	Length
1.	"Rakka Rakka"	Vinayak Sasikumar	Shankar Mahadevan, Nakshatra Santhosh	3:14
2.	"Vaarmeghame"	Santhosh Varma	Shweta Mohan, Kapil Kapilan	4:57
3.	"Otta Kolakombanaada"	Ajeesh Daasan	Yazin Nizar	3:04
4.	"Mujhe Paale"	Sai Anand	Pavithra Chaari, Sarthak Kalyani	3:21
5.	"Praanan Pol"	Vinayak Sasikumar	Kapil Kapilan	3:34

== Release and Reception ==
=== Critical response ===
Bandra received negative reviews from critics.

Bhawna Arya of Times Now gave 3 out of 5 stars and wrote, "Bandra delves deep into the criminal world of Bombay in the late 1980s. The showcases the challenges in the life of a gangster and how he works for the welfare of his people and the ones who rely on them." Swathi P. Ajith of Onmanorama wrote, "Bandra holds promise for a stylish and action-packed film, but an unfocused portrayal somewhat steers it away from its original intent."

Anna Mathews of The Times of India gave 2.5 out of 5 stars and wrote, "Arun Gopy tries to build up some massy moments, but it doesn't have the energy of big entertainers. The film had a promising premise of the menacing underworld involvement in Bollywood film production in the 90s, but it has been wasted." Arundhati Anil of The Week gave 1.5 out of 5 stars and wrote, "Overall, a dull script, decent performances from the cast and enticing action and dance sequences make Bandra a forgettable but somewhat entertaining action flick."

Vignesh Madhu of Cinema Express gave 1 out of 5 stars and called it "a sluggish and sloppy potboiler". Anandu Suresh of The Indian Express gave 1.5 out of 5 stars and wrote, "Bandra starts off as an unpromising movie and ends pretty much the same way, after making the viewers experience too many déjà vus." Ryan Gomez of OTTplay gave 1.5 out of 5 stars and wrote, "Bandra promises far too much and delivers far too little. Despite featuring a star-studded ensemble, director Arun Gopy's Malayalam film is devoid of originality, a coherent story, and compelling characters."

=== Box office ===
Bandra collected ₹2.8 crore by the end of its second day of release and grossed approximately ₹6 crore during its theatrical run. The film was a commercial failure.

=== Home media ===
Disney+ Hotstar was initially rumoured to have acquired the streaming rights of the film. Later, there were reports that Amazon Prime Video had acquired the streaming rights in November 2024. However, this did not materialize.

The streaming rights of the film were eventually acquired by ZEE5 and it began streaming on 13 November 2026 after 3 years of theatrical release.
