= Royal Fables =

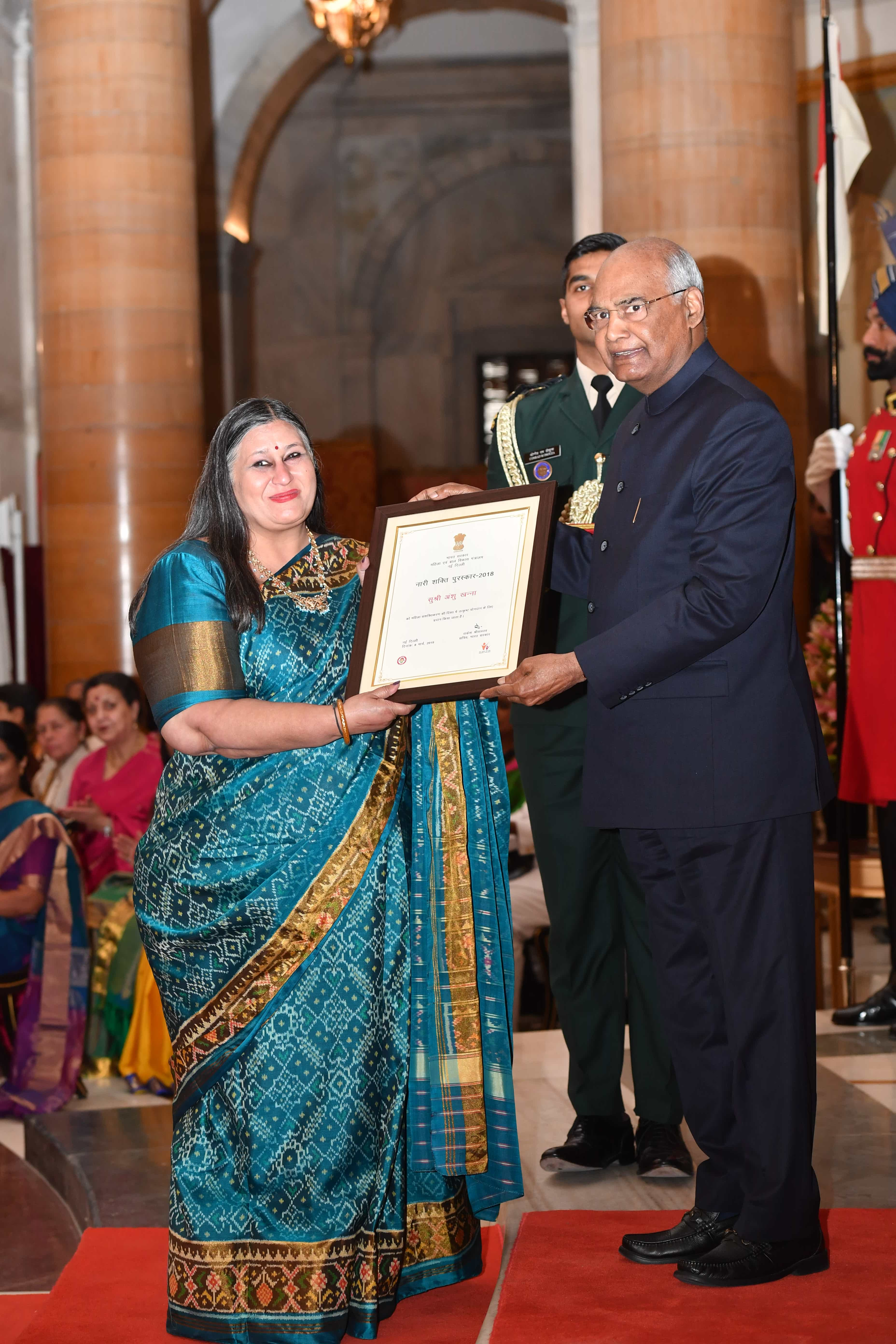
Anshu Khanna receiving the Nari Shakti Puraskar in 2018

Royal Fables is an exposition that presents art, design and fashion by patrons who belong to Indian royal families. It features traditional crafts as practiced in royal courts. Royal Fables features 30 royal and noble families engaged in keeping the art and craft of India alive.

Founded by Anshu Khanna who was awarded the Nari Shakti Puraskar in 2018 for her role in promoting and showcasing the legacy of artisanal karkhanas that is being revived by many young scions of royal families, Royal Fables began its journey in the year 2010 at DLF Emporio, the mecca of International luxury. Through the last ten years, Royal Fables has held successful shows in New Delhi, Mumbai, Ahmedabad, Chandigarh, Lucknow and Hyderabad in India and Morocco, Thailand, Vancouver, Surrey, Los Angeles, Dallas and Miami, overseas.

Royal Fables presents the Palace Atelier Collection developed by Princess Diya Kumari of Jaipur, enamel art by Princess Jyotsana Singh of Jammu & Kashmir, miniature art by Princess Vaishnavi Kumari of Kishangarh, Raja Ravi Varma Lithographs developed at Maharaja Fateh Singh Museum by Maharani Radhikaraje Gaekwad of Baroda and wildlife paintings by Princess Krishna Kumari of Panna amongst others.
