= Cryo-Cell International =

- Company type: Public
- Traded as: AMEX: CCEL
- Founded: 1989
- Founder: Dan Richard
- Headquarters: Oldsmar, FL, United States
- Area served: Chile; Costa Rica; Ecuador; El Salvador; Guatemala; Honduras; India; Mexico; Nicaragua; Pakistan; Panama; Peru; Republica Dominicana; United States; Venezuela
- Key people: David Portnoy, Co-CEO and Mark Portnoy, Co-CEO
- Services: Cord blood and cord tissue stem cell preservation and research
- Website: cryo-cell.com Investor Relations: ir.cryo-cell.com

Cryo-Cell International, Inc. is a cord blood bank. It was founded by Dan Richard in 1989. Cryo-Cell International is the first private cord blood bank to separate and store stem cells. Cryo-Cell is headquartered outside of Tampa, in Oldsmar, Florida. In January 1997, the Company's stock began trading on the NASDAQ Small Cap market under symbol CCEL.

== Operations ==
Cryo-Cell International’s facility is FDA registered, cGMP-/cGTP-compliant. Cryo-Cell International is accredited by the American Association of Blood Banks. Cryo-Cell International is FACT accredited. Cryo-Cell International is ISO 9001:2008 certified by the BSI Group.

Cryo-Cell International services include the cryopreservation of umbilical cord blood and cord tissue. The company has also patented a method for processing endometrial stem cells from menstrual blood.

== Legal conflicts ==
In 1992, Cryo-Cell International and the University of Arizona signed a contract under which Cryo-Cell would provide state-of-the-art equipment for cord blood storage and use 'its best efforts' to expand the University of Arizona’s cord blood bank. In July 1998, a jury in California Superior Court in San Francisco awarded Cryo-Cell $1,050,000 for the University's breach of contract and a $120,000 judgment against the University and David Harris personally for improperly transferring customer lists Cryo-Cell helped compile to a competitor. The University's cross complaint against Cryo-Cell was unanimously rejected by the jury.

In 2002, Cryo-Cell International was among eight American cord blood companies sued for patent infringement by PharmaStem; PharmaStem was awarded damages of $7.1 million in 2003 from Cryo-Cell and three other companies, the rest having gone out of business.

The PharmaStem patent infringement lawsuit was ultimately overturned. In December 2004, a federal judge in Delaware reversed the last remaining aspect of a $7.1 million judgment from October 2003 for patent infringement against several of the nation's largest umbilical-cord blood banks. The Federal Circuit Court of Appeals held that the claims asserted in the lawsuit were invalid and the United States Patent and Trademark Office cancelled all claims on the patents in the PharmaStem lawsuit.

In 2008, in Portnoy vs. Cryo-Cell International, the company's incumbent board was judged to have committed serious breaches of fiduciary duty in tampering with a shareholder election, preventing the replacement of the board of directors. The court therefore ordered a special shareholders’ meeting at which a new election would be held. In August, 2011, Mr. Portnoy led a group in a winning proxy fight which resulted in the replacement of the company's board of directors.
