= Syngeneic stem cell transplantation =

Medical procedure

Syngeneic stem cell transplantation is a procedure in which a patient receives blood-forming stem cells (cells from which all blood cells develop) donated by his or her healthy identical twin.
