= Center for International Blood and Marrow Transplant Research =

The Center for International Blood and Marrow Transplant Research (CIBMTR) is a research collaboration between the National Marrow Donor Program and the Medical College of Wisconsin.

CIBMTR provides information to the medical and scientific communities. As of October 2024, it has over 1,800 publications, data from over 675,000 people, and continually runs and publishes studies and clinical trials. CIBMTR Working Committees and data access policies make CIBMTR data available to investigators, physicians and patients.
