= Stephen Caracappa and Louis Eppolito =

Former policemen and convicted felons

Stephen Caracappa (left) and Louis Eppolito (right)

Stephen Caracappa and Louis Eppolito were former New York City Police Department (NYPD) detectives who committed various illegal activities on behalf of the Five Families of the American Mafia, principally the Lucchese and Gambino crime families. The two subsequently became known as the "Mafia Cops".

In 2005, the United States Attorney for the Eastern District of New York indicted Caracappa and Eppolito on charges of racketeering conspiracy for a pattern of murders, kidnappings, witness tampering, obstruction of justice, money laundering and narcotics dealing with mobsters and mob associates, spanning from the mid-1980s to the mid-2000s. Both were convicted in 2006 and sentenced to life imprisonment in 2009.

== Police careers ==
=== Caracappa ===
Stephen Caracappa
- Born: November 12, 1942; New York City, New York, U.S.
- Died: April 8, 2017 (aged 74); FMC Butner, Durham County, North Carolina, U.S.
- Other name: The Stick
- Police career
- Country: United States
- Department: New York Police Department
- Service years: 1969–1992
- Rank: Sworn in as an officer: 1969; Detective: 1979
- Criminal information
- Convictions: Racketeering, obstruction of justice, extortion and eight counts of murder and conspiracy
- Penalty: Life imprisonment plus 80 years and fined more than $4 million

Stephen Caracappa (November 12, 1942 – April 8, 2017) had worked in the Organized Crime Homicide Unit of the New York City Police Department (NYPD) since the late 1970s before he eventually retired on a disability pension in 1992, living for a time in Great Kills, Staten Island. He subsequently worked as a private investigator and retired in the mid-1990s, moving to Las Vegas, Nevada, along with Eppolito. Caracappa was working inside the Las Vegas Women's Correctional Facility as a corrections officer at the time of his arrest. While on trial in 2006, both he and Eppolito claimed that they were discriminated against during the proceedings.

=== Eppolito ===
Louis Eppolito
- Born: July 22, 1948; Brooklyn, New York, U.S.
- Died: 3 November 2019 (aged 71); Tucson, Arizona, U.S.
- Other name: Louie
- Spouse: Frances Ann Eppolito
- Police career
- Country: United States
- Department: New York Police Department
- Service years: 1969–1990
- Rank: Sworn in as an officer: 1969; Detective: 1977
- Criminal information
- Convictions: Racketeering, obstruction of justice, extortion and eight counts of murder and conspiracy
- Penalty: Life imprisonment plus 100 years and fined more than $4 million

Louis Eppolito (July 22, 1948 – November 3, 2019) was born in Brooklyn, New York, the son of Theresa Eppolito, a registered nurse, and Ralph Eppolito, an associate of the Gambino crime family. Eppolito's paternal uncle and cousin, James Eppolito and James Eppolito Jr., were also both made members of the Gambino family, belonging to capo Nino Gaggi's crew. Growing up in East Flatbush, Eppolito became acquainted with several other mobsters. His uncle and cousin were eventually murdered by both Gaggi and Gambino soldier Roy DeMeo, with the permission of Gambino boss Paul Castellano. When he applied to the NYPD in 1969, Eppolito falsely stated that he had no relatives in organized crime.

Eppolito eventually rose to the rank of detective in 1977, a job which garnered him a number of headlines. In 1983, he was suspected and cleared of passing NYPD intelligence reports to Rosario Gambino, a distant relative of Castellano and Carlo Gambino. He retired as a police officer in late 1990. In 1992, Eppolito wrote a book, Mafia Cop: The Story of an Honest Cop Whose Family Was the Mob, in which he spoke of his attempts to avoid being dragged into the Mafia and having to fight for his reputation as a result of the Rosario Gambino case, which he cited as a reason for his leaving the NYPD.

After meeting actor Joe Pesci in Cafe Central, a restaurant frequented by celebrities, Eppolito had a minor career as an actor, with small roles in movies including Lost Highway, Predator 2 and Goodfellas. He moved to Las Vegas around 1994 and sold automobiles at an Infiniti dealership, where he would entertain fellow salesmen with crime scene photos from his time on the force.

== Mafia careers ==
By 1985, federal authorities recognized Caracappa and Eppolito as associates of the Mafia in New York City. Both were known for using inappropriate methods to get results in their police work.

=== Anthony "Gaspipe" Casso ===
According to Lucchese family underboss Anthony "Gaspipe" Casso when trying to enroll in Witness Protection in 1994, he and his boss Vittorio "Vic" Amuso had paid Eppolito and Caracappa $375,000 in bribes – and payments for murder contracts – beginning in 1985. Casso stated in 1986 that, as retaliation for an attempt on Casso's life – on the orders of Casso and Amuso – the two police detectives kidnapped and handed over James Hydell, an associate of the Gambino family, to be murdered by Casso.

Later, again on Casso's orders, Caracappa and Eppolito murdered made Lucchese member Bruno Facciolo with the assistance of Louis Daidone, due to Casso suspecting him of being an informant. Facciolo's murder is famous for the stuffed canary federal agents found in his mouth at the crime scene, considered to be a message to other informants. At least partially in retaliation for the 1985 murder of Castellano, arranged by John Gotti, Casso ordered Caracappa and Eppolito to kill Gambino capo Edward "Eddie" Lino. On November 6, 1990, the detectives pulled Lino over in his Mercedes-Benz and shot him nine times.

=== Las Vegas "retirement" ===
After wholesale indictments came down for almost every crime family in New York in the mid-1990s, Caracappa and Eppolito retired to Las Vegas, where Casso later confirmed that both were still involved in mob business. The "Mafia Cops" were contacted in 1993 by Frank Lastorino to murder the new head of the Gambino family, John "Junior" Gotti, whose father was imprisoned for life in 1992. The plot failed.

Lastorino also wanted the detectives to murder the underboss of the Lucchese family, Stephen "Wonderboy" Crea, but this plot also failed due to indictments brought against the family. In the late 1990s, both Caracappa and Eppolito conspired to kill former Gambino underboss Salvatore "Sammy the Bull" Gravano, who had entered the Witness Protection Program in 1992 after testifying against the elder Gotti, and collect a reward promised by Gotti's brother Peter. Gravano was later arrested and convicted of drug trafficking in 2003 and was sentenced to serve nineteen years in prison.

== Convictions and sentencing ==
After a long investigation, highlighted by Burton Kaplan's decision to testify against his former confederates, both Caracappa and Eppolito were arrested in March 2005 at Piero's Italian Cuisine, Las Vegas, and charged with counts of racketeering, obstruction of justice, extortion, and eight counts of murder and conspiracy. These included the murders of James Hydell, Nicholas Guido, Israel Greenwald, John "Otto" Heidel, "John Doe", Anthony DiLapi, Bruno Facciolo, Edward Lino, and Bartholomew Boriello – and their involvement in the conspiracy to murder Gravano. Kaplan, a businessman and career criminal who had been the link between Casso and the two detectives, was the chief accuser, giving two days of riveting testimony at trial.

On June 30, 2006, the presiding federal judge, Jack B. Weinstein, threw out a racketeering murder conviction against Caracappa and Eppolito on a technicality – the five-year statute of limitations had expired on the key charge of racketeering conspiracy. On September 17, 2008, their racketeering convictions were ordered reinstated by a federal appeals court. New York City paid $18.4 million to settle seven lawsuits brought by families of the victims of Caracappa and Eppolito.

The federal government can take my life. I'm a man. They can't take my soul. They can't take my pride. They can't take my dignity... I was a hard-working cop. I never hurt anybody. I never kidnapped anybody... I never did any of this.

— Louis Eppolito at his sentencing

On March 6, 2009, Eppolito was sentenced to life imprisonment plus 100 years, and Caracappa to life plus 80 years. Each was fined more than $4 million. On July 23, 2010, their convictions were upheld by the Second Circuit.

== Incarceration and death ==
Caracappa was incarcerated at the United States Penitentiary, Coleman in Florida. He was transferred to a federal prison in North Carolina before dying of cancer on April 8, 2017.

Eppolito was incarcerated at the United States Penitentiary, Tucson, a high-security federal prison. He died on November 3, 2019, in federal custody at a Tucson hospital. His cause of death has not been disclosed.
