= June (company) =

Technology company

- Founded: June, 2015
- Headquarters: San Francisco
- Area served: United States
- Key people: Matt Van Horn (Co-founder, President, CEO); Nikhil Bhogal (Co-founder, CTO)
- Number of employees: 40
- Parent: Weber Inc.
- Website: juneoven.com

June is a home automation company based in San Francisco. Its first product was the June Intelligent Oven, a Wi-Fi-enabled, app-connected countertop convection oven that employs machine learning and computer vision technologies to identify and cook food.

== History ==
June was founded by Matt Van Horn and Nikhil Bhogal and launched in June 2015. Van Horn previously co-founded Zimride, which spun off the ride-sharing service Lyft, while Bhogal designed the camera software for the iPhone's first five generations and was as an inventor on multiple Apple camera software patents. June team members have also worked on the Apple Watch, GoPro cameras and Fitbit fitness trackers. Michelin-starred chef Michael Mina is an advisor to June.

The first generation oven was launched in December 2016. June launched its second generation June Oven in August 2018 as the "do-it-all oven" and seven appliances in one - a countertop convection oven, air fryer, slow cooker, dehydrator, broiler, toaster and warming drawer.

== Design ==
The oven is controlled by a 5-inch touch screen and connected app. Programmable and sensor-driven, the oven uses a built-in scale, core-temperature thermometer and a camera to suggest cooking time and temperature. The internal high-definition camera with a fisheye lens that is designed to recognize commonly cooked foods. The company claims the oven's optical recognition can identify foods such as frozen pizza, bacon, Brussels sprouts, asparagus, and potatoes and can differentiate between different types of fish.

The June Oven has dual-surround convection fans, digital TRIAC controllers, a GPU processor, a 2.3-gigahertz NVIDIA chip, and carbon-fiber heating elements. Ammunition Design Group aided with the industrial design of the June Oven and Quanta Computer aided in the manufacturing.

The iOS and Android apps display a live-stream video of the inside of the oven and then sends a notification when the food is done.

== Funding ==
June received $7 million in Series A funding from the Foundry Group, First Round Capital, Lerer Ventures, and Founders Fund.

== Acquisition ==
On January 12, 2021, it was announced that June was acquired by Weber Inc. for an undisclosed amount. Following the acquisition, it will exist as a "strategic business unit" within Weber. Co-founder Matt Van Horn will serve, as president of June while the company's other co-founder, Nikhil Bhogal, will become senior vice president, technology and connected devices of Weber. Van Horn will continue to focus on June Oven while Bhogal will work with Weber R&D programs and new products.

== Discontinuation of support ==
On July 22, 2026, Weber announced that the June mobile application and June's cloud-connected services would be discontinued on September 22, 2026. Remote monitoring and control, live video viewing through the app, app notifications, app-only recipe features, and software updates were no longer available.

The oven itself was not disabled. Weber stated that core cooking functions and experiences available through the oven's built-in touchscreen would continue to operate, provided that the latest software update had been installed before the shutdown date. Weber also stated that software updates, official support, repairs, and replacement parts would no longer be available after September 22, 2026.

== Project July ==
Project July is an unofficial community initiative intended to replicate the functions of certain cloud-connected services in June Ovens, after the shutdown of June's cloud services. Software provided by the project provides control over the local network by installing a web server on the oven.
