= Stephen Siegel =

American real estate mogul

- Born: September 13, 1944 (age 82); Bronx, New York
- Occupation: Real estate executive
- Known for: Chairman of CBRE and New York real estate deal maker
- Spouse: Wendy Siegel

Stephen Barry Siegel (born September 13, 1944) is an American businessperson and New York real estate deal maker who became the Chairman of Global Brokerage at CBRE, which at that time was the world's largest commercial real estate services company.

Siegel was featured in the Urban Land Institute's book, Leadership Legacies: Lessons Learned from Ten Real Estate Legends. The previous year, Mr. Siegel was awarded with Commercial Property News' Lifetime Achievement Award and named by Crain's as one of the 100 Most Influential Business Leaders in New York City.

== Early life and education ==
Siegel was born to a Jewish family in the Bronx, New York. His father was a laborer and his mother was a school crossing guard.

At the age of 17, he took a job as a real-estate broker at Cushman & Wakefield.

== Career ==
Siegel was chairman and CEO of Insignia/ESG prior to the merger with CBRE. He directed the global expansion of the firm, nationwide as well as throughout Europe, Japan, Hong Kong, China, Thailand and Latin America. He also managed a group that completed approximately $2 billion in co-investments in a wide range of U.S. office, residential, hotel and retail real estate portfolios.

Throughout his career, he has arranged transactions for some major US corporate clients including J.P. Morgan Chase & Co., Sidley Austin Brown & Wood LLP, Fried, Frank, Harris, Shriver & Jacobson LLP, Amerada Hess Corp., Sanford C. Bernstein & Co., Swiss Reinsurance, MetLife, Cerberus Capital Management and Akin, Gump, Strauss, Hauer & Feld LLP.

In 2006, Siegel negotiated Gucci Group's lease at Trump Tower in Manhattan, which at that time the most valuable retail deal ever completed, on behalf of The Trump Organization. He also advised Hudson Waterfront Associates, a partnership of several overseas investors, on the acquisition of 1290 Avenue of the Americas for $1.25 billion, and then re-sold it one year later to Vornado Realty Trust. In addition, Siegel arranged the $306 million sale of the parcel on the southeast corner of 42nd Street and Eighth Avenue, the last developable site within the 42nd Street Development Project, to SJP Properties, which is constructing Eleven Times Square, a one million-sq.-ft. office property, on the site.

In 2006, Siegel along with partners Andrew and Joseph Goldberg, purchased La Rochelle, an 87-unit pre-war rental apartment building on Manhattan's Upper West Side.

== Other interests ==
Siegel became a member of Board of Directors of the Gift of Life Marrow Registry where he actively helped grow the database of volunteers willing to donate bone marrow and blood stem cells to patients battling blood cancer.

He is also a member of the board of the Jazz Foundation of America. In 2001, he donated $350,000 to the Lower East Side Tenement Museum in honor of his parents. He is a supporter of the remaining Jewish population in Cuba and serves as a mentor to the Young Jewish Professionals Real Estate Network.

== Philanthropy ==
He founded the AHRC-NYC's "Stephen B. Siegel Adult Day Care Center" (located in Fulton Landing, New York); inducted into the group's Hall of Honor in 1999.

== Recognition ==
- American Jewish Committee's 2007 Real Estate Division National Human Relations Award
- Israel Bonds' Real Estate and Construction Division's 2007 Israel Peace Medal for his leadership in building Israel's economy through the Israel Bonds program
- The Real Estate Board of New York's inaugural Edward S. Gordon Memorial Award in 2004 for the purchase of 230 West 41st Street
- The Real Estate Board of New York's 2003 Henry Hart Rice Achievement Award for the Most Ingenious Deal of the Year for the sale of the McGraw-Hill Companies’ interest in 1221 Avenue of the Americas
- Crohn's & Colitis Foundation "Man of the Year" Award in 2002
- National Ethnic Coalition of Organizations' Ellis Island Medal of Honor in 2002
- Five-time winner of Commercial Property News’ Brokerage Executive of the Year Award
- Monmouth University Real Estate Institute's Leadership Excellence Award in 2001
- New York University Real Estate Institute's Urban Leadership Award in 2000
- The Foundation Fighting Blindness Humanitarian Award in 1999

He was awarded honorary Doctorate degrees from St. Thomas Aquinas College, Commercial Science, 2007, Baruch College, 2003, Monmouth University, commencement 2003. He has been honored by The Young Men's/Women's Real Estate Association.
