= Matt Van Horn =

American entrepreneur

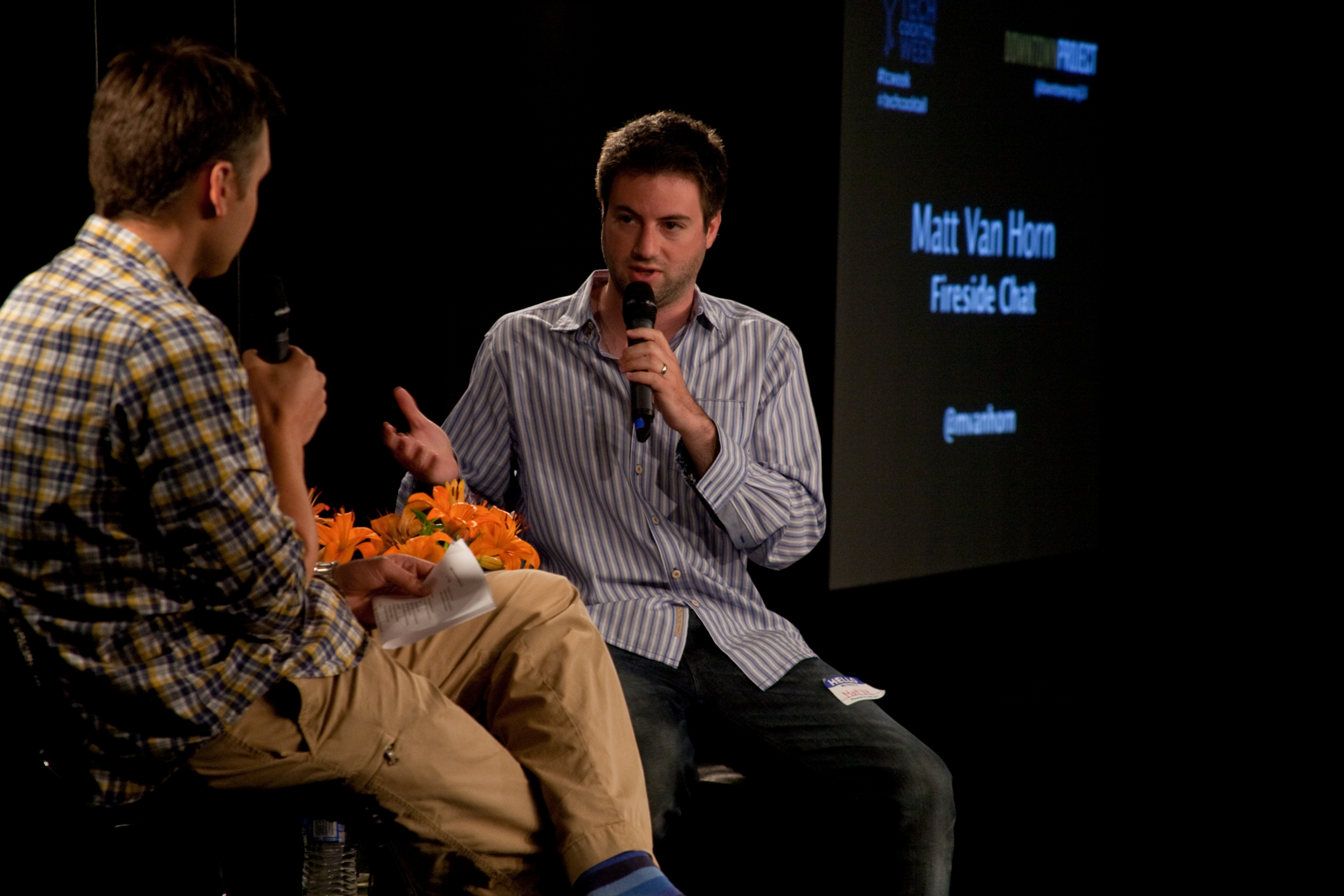
Matt Van Horn in July 2013

Matt Van Horn is an American entrepreneur and the CEO and co-founder of June, maker of the June Intelligent Oven. Previously he co-founded Zimride, now called the ride-sharing service Lyft, was Vice President of Business at Path, and ran partnerships at Digg He also worked at Apple while attending college.

== Personal life ==
Van Horn lives in San Francisco, California with his wife Lauren Van Horn to whom he live-streamed his marriage proposal in 2010. He grew up in Pacific Palisades, Los Angeles.

== Education ==
Van Horn graduated from University of Arizona in 2006 where he studied entrepreneurship and marketing. He made Eller's Dean's List in 2006 for excellence in leadership.
