= Cord blood =

Blood in the placenta and umbilical cord after birth

Clinical data
- Trade names: Allocord, Ducord, Hemacord, others
- AHFS/Drugs.com: Micromedex Detailed Consumer Information; Micromedex Detailed Consumer Information
- License data: US DailyMed: Hematopoietic progenitor cell
- Routes of administration: Intravenous
- ATC code: None

Legal status
- Legal status: US: ℞-only

Identifiers
- DrugBank: DB11054
- UNII: XU53VK93MC

Cord blood (umbilical cord blood) is blood that remains in the placenta and in the attached umbilical cord after childbirth. Cord blood is collected because it contains stem cells, which can be used to treat hematopoietic and genetic disorders.

== Constituents ==
Cord blood is composed of all the elements found in whole blood – red blood cells, white blood cells, plasma, and platelets. Compared to adult peripheral blood, some differences in the blood composition exist, for example, cord blood contains higher numbers of natural killer cells, lower absolute number of T-cells and a higher proportion of immature T-cells. However, the interest in cord blood is mostly driven by the observation that cord blood also contains various types of stem and progenitor cells, mostly hematopoietic stem cells. Some non-hematopoietic stem cell types are also present in cord blood, for example, mesenchymal stem cells, however, these are present in much lower numbers than what can be found in adult bone marrow. Endothelial progenitor cells and multipotent unrestricted adult stem cells can also be found in cord blood. Unlike embryonic stem cells, which are pluripotent, cord blood stem cells are multipotent.

== Medical uses ==
Cord blood is used the same way that hematopoietic stem cell transplantation is used to reconstitute bone marrow following chemotherapy and/or radiation treatment for various blood cancers, and for various forms of anemia. Its efficacy is similar to bone marrow transplants. According to reports from the European Society for Blood and Marrow Transplantation (EBMT), cord blood has been used in the treatment of more than 80 diseases, primarily hematologic malignancies, bone marrow failure syndromes, inherited metabolic disorders, and certain immunodeficiencies. In transplantation medicine, cord blood serves as an alternative source of hematopoietic stem cells. Analysis of the data from the Center for International Blood and Marrow Transplant Research (CIBMTR) on 2429 patients who received UCBT from 1999-2024 for a plastic anemia/autoimmunity, inborn errors of immunity and metabolism, hemoglobinopathies, and other hematological diseases, showed that UCBT should be considered among the most effective donor options for patients with non-malignant diseases, with the overall survival at 1, 5, and 10 years equal 75%, 71%, and 68%, respectively.

== Adverse effects in transplantation ==
Adverse effects of transplanting cord blood stem cells are similar to hematopoietic stem cell transplantation from bone marrow, namely graft-versus-host disease if the cord blood is from a genetically different person, and the risk of severe infection while the immune system is reconstituted. To ensure that the fewest number of complications occur during transplantation, levels of engraftment must be present; specifically, both neutrophils and platelets must be produced. This process of neutrophil and platelet production after the transplant, however, takes much longer than that of stem cells. In many cases, the engraftment time depends on the cell dose, or the number of stem cells obtained in the sample of blood. In Dr. Moise's article about umbilical cord blood, it was found that there are approximately 10% fewer stem cells in cord blood than in bone marrow. Therefore, a sufficient amount of cord blood must be obtained in order to collect an adequate cell dose; however, this amount varies from infant to infant and is irreplaceable. Because limited cell dose has historically restricted cord blood use (particularly in larger children and adults), ex vivo expansion and graft engineering approaches have been developed to increase the effective progenitor/stem cell dose. In the United States, the FDA has approved an expanded/engineered cord blood–derived hematopoietic progenitor cell therapy (Omisirge, omidubicel-onlv) for use in patients undergoing cord blood transplantation to reduce time to neutrophil recovery and infectious complications. In Europe, a cord blood–derived stem cell product using UM171-based expansion (Zemcelpro) has received a conditional marketing authorisation. Although earlier studies noted uncertainty about very long-term cryostorage, subsequent stability studies have reported preserved viability and functional potency of cryopreserved cord blood units after decades of storage, including evidence consistent with maintained key quality parameters after up to 29 years of cryopreservation. There is a lower incidence with cord blood compared with traditional HSCT, despite less stringent HLA match requirements.

== Collection and storage ==
Umbilical cord blood is the blood left over in the placenta and in the umbilical cord after the birth of the baby. There are several methods for collecting cord blood. The method most commonly used in clinical practice is the "closed technique", which is similar to standard blood collection techniques. With this method, the technician cannulates the vein of the severed umbilical cord using a needle that is connected to a blood bag, and cord blood flows through the needle into the bag. On average, the closed technique enables the collection of about 75 ml of cord blood.

Collected cord blood is cryopreserved and then stored in a cord blood bank for future transplantation. Cord blood collection is typically depleted of red blood cells before cryopreservation to ensure high rates of stem cell recovery.

== History ==
The first successful cord blood transplant (CBT) was done in 1988 in a child with Fanconi anemia. Early efforts to use CBT in adults led to mortality rates of about 50%, due somewhat to the procedure being done in very sick people, but perhaps also due to slow development of immune cells from the transplant. By 2013, 30,000 CBT procedures had been performed, and public banks held about 600,000 units of cord blood.

== Society and culture ==
=== Legal status ===
Hemacord (HPC, cord blood) was approved for medical use in the US in 2011.

Ducord (HPC Cord Blood) was approved for medical use in the US in 2012.

Allocord (HPC Cord Blood) was approved for medical use in the US in 2013.

Cordcyte was approved for medical use in the US in 2013.

Clevecord (HPC Cord Blood) was approved for medical use in the US in 2016.

Regenecyte (HPC, Cord Blood) was approved for medical use in the US in November 2024.

=== Regulation ===
The AABB has generated voluntary accreditation standards for cord blood banking facilities.

In the United States, the Food and Drug Administration regulates any facility that stores cord blood; cord blood intended for use in the person from whom it came is not regulated, but cord blood for use in others is regulated as a drug and as a biologic. Several states have regulations for cord blood banks.

In the European Union, Canada, and Australia use of cord blood is regulated. In the United Kingdom, the NHS Cord Blood Bank was set up in 1996 to collect, process, store and supply cord blood; it is a public cord blood bank and part of the NHS.

=== Private and public banks ===
A cord blood bank may be private (i.e. the blood is stored for and the costs paid by donor families) or public (i.e. stored and made available for use by unrelated donors). While public cord blood banking is widely supported, private cord banking is controversial in both the medical and parenting communities. Although umbilical cord blood is well-recognized to be useful for treating hematopoietic and genetic disorders, some controversy surrounds the collection and storage of umbilical cord blood by private banks for the baby's use. Only a small percentage of babies (estimated at between 1 in 1,000 to 1 in 200,000) ever use the umbilical cord blood that is stored. The American Academy of Pediatrics 2007 Policy Statement on Cord Blood Banking stated: "Physicians should be aware of the unsubstantiated claims of private cord blood banks made to future parents that promise to insure infants or family members against serious illnesses in the future by use of the stem cells contained in cord blood." and "private storage of cord blood as 'biological insurance' is unwise" unless there is a family member with a current or potential need to undergo a stem cell transplantation. The American Academy of Pediatrics also notes that the odds of using a person's own cord blood is 1 in 200,000 while the Institute of Medicine says that only 14 such procedures have ever been performed.

Private storage of one's own cord blood is unlawful in Italy and France, and it is also discouraged in some other European countries. The American Medical Association states "Private banking should be considered in the unusual circumstance when there exists a family predisposition to a condition in which umbilical cord stem cells are therapeutically indicated. However, because of its cost, limited likelihood of use, and inaccessibility to others, private banking should not be recommended to low-risk families." The American Society for Blood and Marrow Transplantation and the American Congress of Obstetricians and Gynecologists also encourage public cord banking and discourage private cord blood banking. Nearly all cord blood transplantations come from public banks, rather than private banks, partly because most treatable conditions can't use a person's own cord blood. The World Marrow Donor Association and European Group on Ethics in Science and New Technologies states "The possibility of using one's own cord blood stem cells for regenerative medicine is currently purely hypothetical....It is therefore highly hypothetical that cord blood cells kept for autologous use will be of any value in the future" and "the legitimacy of commercial cord blood banks for autologous use should be questioned as they sell a service which has presently no real use regarding therapeutic options."

The American Academy of Pediatrics, or AAP, supports efforts to provide information about the potential benefits and limitations of cord blood banking and transplantation so that parents can make an informed decision. Cord blood education is also supported by legislators at the federal and state levels. In 2005, the National Academy of Sciences published an Institute of Medicine (IoM) report titled "Establishing a National Cord Blood Stem Cell Bank Program".

In March 2004, the European Union Group on Ethics (EGE) has issued Opinion No.19 titled Ethical Aspects of Umbilical Cord Blood Banking. The EGE concluded that "[t]he legitimacy of commercial cord blood banks for autologous use should be questioned as they sell a service, which has presently no real use regarding therapeutic options. Thus, they promise more than they can deliver. The activities of such banks raise serious ethical criticisms."

== Research ==
Though uses of cord blood beyond blood and immunological disorders is speculative, some research has been done in other areas. Any such potential beyond blood and immunological uses is limited by the fact that cord cells are hematopoietic stem cells (which can differentiate only into blood cells), and not pluripotent stem cells (such as embryonic stem cells, which can differentiate into any type of tissue). Cord blood has been studied as a treatment for diabetes. However, apart from blood disorders, the use of cord blood for other diseases is not in routine clinical use and remains a major challenge for the stem cell community.

Along with cord blood, Wharton's jelly and the cord lining have been explored as sources for mesenchymal stem cells (MSC), and as of 2015 had been studied in vitro, in animal models, and in early stage clinical trials for cardiovascular diseases, as well as neurological deficits, liver diseases, immune system diseases, diabetes, lung injury, kidney injury, and leukemia.

Cord blood is being used to get stem cells with which to test in people with type 1 diabetes mellitus. The stem cells from umbilical cord blood are also being used in the treatment of a number of blood diseases, including blood cancers.

Cord blood is also being studied as a substitute for normal blood transfusions in the developing world. More research is necessary prior to the generalized utilization of cord blood transfusion.

Cord blood stem cells are being studied for the treatment of COVID-19 cytokine storms since these and other perinatal (cord tissue and placental tissue-derived) stem cells can secrete anti-inflammatory molecules. Dozens of clinical trials are underway to see if they can help patients with COVID-19.

Some clinical studies show that one year after the transplant of UM171 (a haematopoietic stem cell self-renewal agonist), transplant-related mortality was 5% and relapse incidence was at 21%. Furthermore, only 3 of 22 patients (~14%) who received the UM171-expanded cord blood transplantation died.

A woman was reported to have been cured of human immunodeficiency virus (HIV), the third person ever to be cured of the disease, using a transplantation of cord blood.
