= Gift of Life Marrow Registry =

Public blood stem cell and bone marrow registry

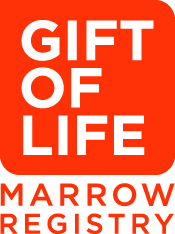
- Type: Non-profit
- Industry: Health care
- Founded: Boca Raton, Florida, USA (1991)
- Headquarters: Boca Raton, USA
- Key people: Jay Feinberg, Founder & CEO; Stephen Siegel, Chairman; William Begal, Chairman Emeritus
- Website: www.giftoflife.org

The Gift of Life Marrow Registry is a non-profit organization founded in 1991 and headquartered in Boca Raton, Florida that operates a public blood stem cell and bone marrow registry while facilitating transplants for children and adults battling life-threatening illnesses, including leukemia, lymphoma, other cancers and genetic diseases.

The registry contains over 470,000 potential donors, and has found more than 31,000 donor matches and facilitated over 5,000 transplants since its inception.

== History ==
Gift of Life was founded following a successful bone marrow registration campaign to save the life of Jay Feinberg, a 22-year-old analyst with the Federal Reserve.

== Background ==
Only 30 percent of patients with diseases treatable with a blood stem cell/bone marrow transplant can find a suitable donor among their family members. The remaining 70 percent must rely on the generosity of an unrelated donor to save their lives. There are more than 90 stem cell and marrow donor registries in 56 countries.

Gift of Life was the first registry in the world to human leukocyte antigen tissue type stem cell and marrow donors on a mass scale at donor drives using buccal swabs.

The organization also conducts outreach initiatives on college campuses, including partnerships with student organizations such as Hillel, Chabad, and fraternities to host donor recruitment drives and educational events

== Collection of stem cells ==
Peripheral blood stem cells: It is possible to collect stem cells from the peripheral blood rather than the bone marrow. In order to collect a sufficient quantity of stem cells, injections of a medication called filgrastim must be administered. This mobilizes stem cells to travel from the bone marrow into the circulating blood. The stem cells are collected through a procedure called apheresis, the same process used to collect several other types of blood components. A cell separating machine filters out the stem cells, which can then be infused into the recipient. Today, peripheral blood stem cells are requested approximately 90 percent of the time.

Bone Marrow: Marrow is found in the hollow cavities of the body's large bones. Donation involves withdrawing 2-3 percent of the donor's total marrow from the iliac crest of the hip, posterior aspect of the donor's pelvic bone. There is no cutting or stitching. The procedure involves a needle aspiration, performed using an anesthetic. Typically, the donor enters a medical center’s outpatient facility in the morning and goes home in the afternoon. Today, bone marrow is requested approximately 10 percent of the time.

There are clinical reasons why one cellular source may be more beneficial for the patient over the other. The transplant physician requests one source based on the patient's circumstances. If a donor declines to donate via one method, the transplant center may or may not be able to accept the other, based on the clinical needs of the patient.

== Gift of Life – NMDP Collection Center ==
In April 2019, Gift of Life opened the Dr. Miriam and Sheldon G. Adelson Gift of Life - NMDP Collection Center in collaboration with NMDP at its Florida headquarters. The Collection Center primarily collects blood stem cells from donors for transplant into a patient. The stem cells are taken by a courier to the patient’s transplant center.

== Center for Cell and Gene Therapy ==
Gift of Life opened a Center for Cell and Gene Therapy at its Boca Raton location in November 2020. The facility houses a Cellular Therapy Laboratory and BioBank. High complexity testing (hematology and flow cytometry), processing (Sepax 2) and cryopreservation are performed at this location.

== Other United States Registries ==
The National Marrow Donor Program (NMDP) is a nonprofit organization founded in 1986 and based in Minneapolis, that operates a registry of volunteer donors and cord blood units. In May 2004, the Gift of Life Marrow Registry and NMDP formed an associate donor registry relationship together.

DKMS, a German bone marrow registry, also operates a large U.S. bone marrow registry.

== Israel ==
Gift of Life Marrow Registry is connected to Israel because many Israel donors are in its database.The organization works with Israel to help save lives though bone marrow donations.
