= World Marrow Donor Association =

Netherlands-based organization

- Company type: Non-profit
- Industry: Health Care
- Founded: Leiden, NL 1986
- Headquarters: Leiden, NL
- Website: www.wmda.info

World Marrow Donor Association (WMDA) is an organization based in Leiden, Netherlands, that coordinates the collection of the HLA phenotypes and other relevant data of volunteer hematopoietic cell donors (used to perform what used to be called bone marrow transplants, but now referred to as hematopoietic cell transplants) and cord blood units across the globe.

The global database with volunteer donors was founded in the Netherlands in 1988. Today, the Search & Match Service of WMDA is the world's largest hematopoietic cell database, listing more than 38 million stem cell donors and over 800,000 cord blood units. WMDA participants consist of 75 hematopoietic cell donor registries from 53 countries, and 53 cord blood banks from 36 countries.

These global hematopoietic cells from donors or cord blood units are used to transplant patients around the world with a variety of life-threatening blood disorders such as leukemia, lymphoma, aplastic anemia, as well as certain immune system and metabolic disorders.
