= Joseph W. Eschbach =

- Joseph Wetherill Eschbach
- Born: January 21, 1933; Detroit, Michigan
- Died: September 7, 2007 (aged 74); Bellevue, Washington

Joseph Wetherill Eschbach (January 21, 1933 – September 7, 2007) was an American doctor and kidney specialist whose twenty years of research starting in the 1960s led to an improvement in the treatment of anemia.

Dr. Eschbach graduated from Jefferson Medical College in 1959. Eschbach was married to MaryAnn Eschbach for 51 years, they had 3 children; 5 grandchildren.

== Anemia Research ==
When his mentor, Dr. Belding H. Scribner, challenged Dr. Eschbach, at the time a young nephrology researcher at the University of Washington, to find a way to correct the anemia in kidney dialysis patients, Dr. Eschbach accepted the challenge. Working with a hematologist, Dr. John W. Adamson, Eschbach looked at various forms of renal failure and the role a natural hormone, erythropoietin, had in preventing anemia. By studying the urine of sheep and other animals in the 1970s, the two scientists helped establish that erythropoietin did stimulate the bone marrow to produce red blood cells.

In the 1980s, Dr. Eschbach helped lead a clinical trial at the Northwest Kidney Centers studying whether an artificial erythropoietin hormone, Epogen, manufactured by Amgen, could replace or supplement the naturally occurring hormone. The trial was successful, and its results were published in The New England Journal of Medicine in 1987: Administering artificial erythropoietin did reverse anemia in kidney patients. His research helped to inform and lead to the Food and Drug Administration's 1989 approval of the replacement hormone Epogen. Epogen and its derivative Erythropoietin Stimulating Agents remain in use throughout the world.

== Affiliations ==
Dr. Eschbach career at the University of Washington began in 1965, first as a clinical instructor, in 1975 Eschbach was named a clinical professor of nephrology. Eschbach worked as a senior research associate at the Northwest Kidney Centers in Seattle, and he served as chair of the Northwest Kidney Centers non-profit board of trustees 1985–1987. On September 26, 2007, the Northwest Kidney Centers based in Seattle, WA and Kirin-Amgen announced an honorary gift to the University of Washington Division of Nephrology to establish the Joseph W. Eschbach Endowed Chair in Kidney Research. "This is the greatest honor of my career," said Dr. Eschbach in August 2007 upon learning of the endowed $1.5 million chair in his name. "I am particularly pleased that NKC and the UW have put emphasis on kidney research since the future well-being of our patients depends on research applied to their needs."

== Medical Practice ==
A private practice nephrologist at Minor and James Medical clinic in Seattle, WA. Eschbach did his pioneering research on anemia while in private practice. From 1965 to 1972 Eschbach served as Director of the NKC home hemodialysis program, the first home dialysis training center in the United States.

== Awards ==
Eschbach was the recipient of David M. Hume Memorial Award, National Kidney Foundation (1995), and the Haviland Award of Excellence, Northwest Kidney Centers Foundation (1991). He is a member of the Institute of Medicine of the National Academy of Sciences (1990). In 2005 Eschbach was awarded the International Society of Nephrology Amgen International Prize. He was an emeritus board member of the Northwest Kidney Centers.
