= Hickman line =

Central venous catheter

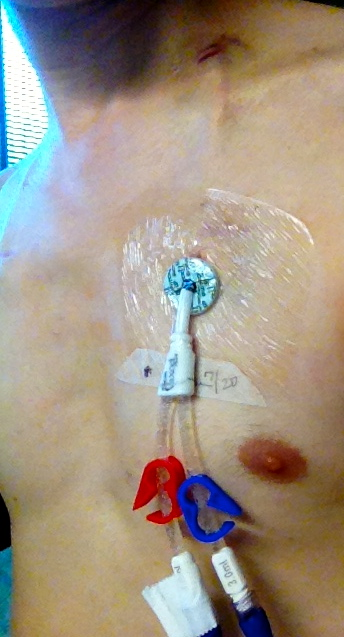
A Hickman line two-lumen catheter inserted on the patient's left side. Scars at the base of the neck indicate the venotomy site and insertion point into the left jugular vein.

A Hickman line is a central venous catheter most often used for the administration of chemotherapy or other medications, as well as for the withdrawal of blood for analysis. Some types are used mainly for the purpose of apheresis or dialysis. They have also been used in total parenteral nutrition (TPN). Hickman lines may remain in place for extended periods and are used when long-term intravenous access is required.

Long-term venous catheters became available in 1968, and the design was improved by Dr. John W. Broviac (b. 1942), a nephrologist based in East Lansing, Michigan, in 1973. Robert O. Hickman, after whom the system is named, further modified the principles in 1979 with subcutaneous tunneling and a Dacron cuff that formed an infection barrier. Hickman (1927–2019) was a pediatric nephrologist at the Seattle Children's Hospital.

== Insertion ==
Hickman lines are inserted under local anaesthetic with or without sedation by a nephrologist, interventional radiologist, or surgeon. The insertion involves two incisions, one at the jugular vein or another nearby vein or groove, and one on the thoracic wall. At the former incision site, a tunnel is created from there through to the latter incision site, and the catheter is pushed through this tunnel until it "exits" the latter incision. The exit area is where the lumen (single, double or multiple) comes out of the thoracic wall. The catheter at the entrance is then inserted back through the entrance site and advanced into the superior vena cava, preferably near the junction of it and the right atrium of the heart. The entrance incision is sutured. The catheter at the exit is secured by means of a "cuff" just under the skin, and the lumen/lumina held in place otherwise by a sterile gauze centered on the exit incision, which also serves the purpose of preventing potential contamination. Throughout the procedure, ultrasound and X-rays are used to ascertain the positioning of the catheter.

Potential complications of placement of such a line include hemorrhage and pneumothorax during insertion and thrombosis or infection at later stages. Patients with a Hickman line therefore require regular flushes of the catheter with normal saline, in order to prevent the line becoming blocked by blood clots. Preventing contamination at the exit site and ensuring that the lumen is flushed frequently is especially important for oncology patients, as they may have become immunocompromised as a result of cytotoxic chemotherapy. Pyrexia (fever) is one of the symptoms of contamination. This symptom and others, including the observance of swelling or bleeding at the exit area, indicate the patient should seek medical attention as soon as possible.

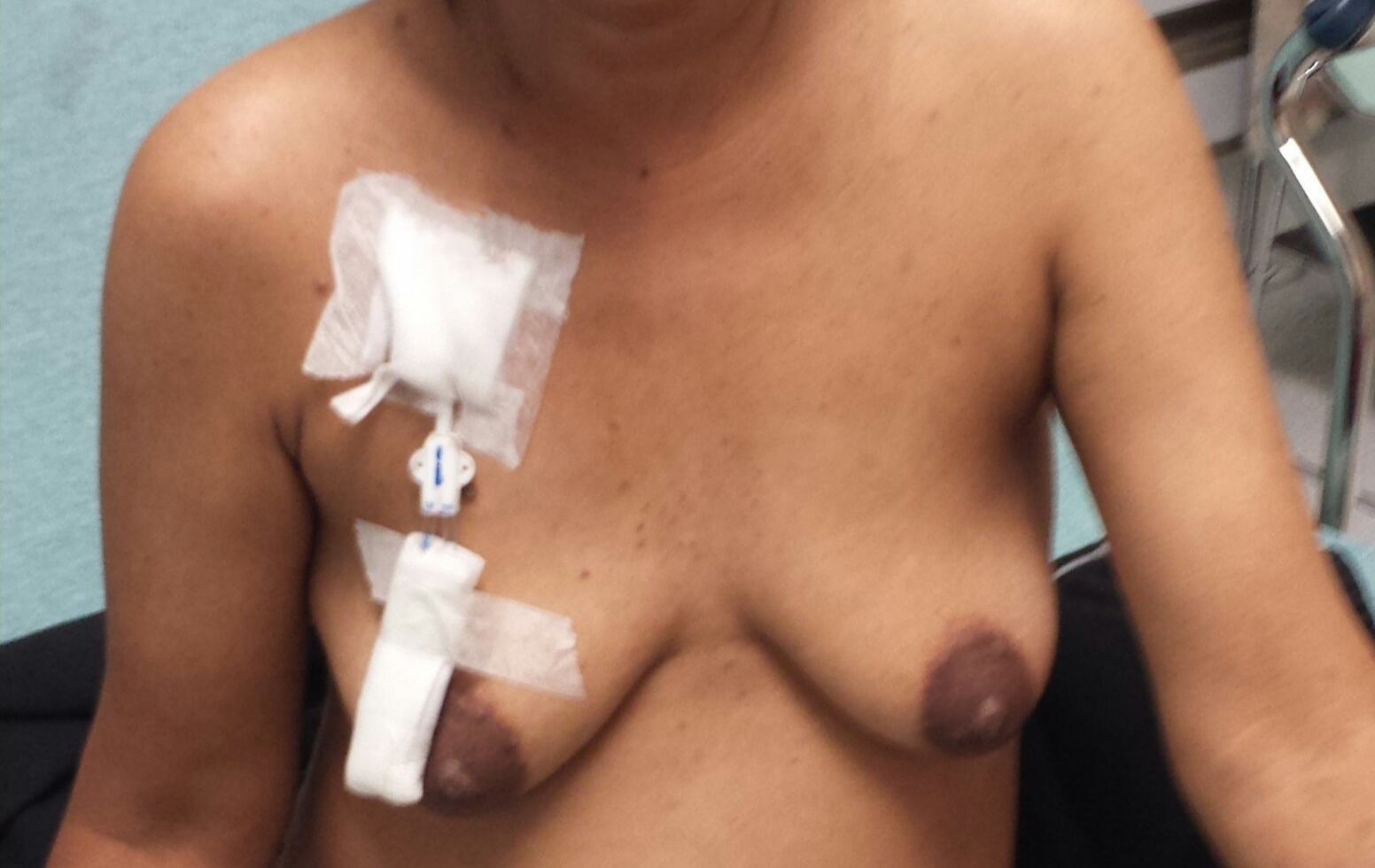
Permacath for dialysis

== See also ==
- Central venous catheter
- Groshong line
- PICC line
- Port (medical)
