= Dialysis catheter =

Medical device

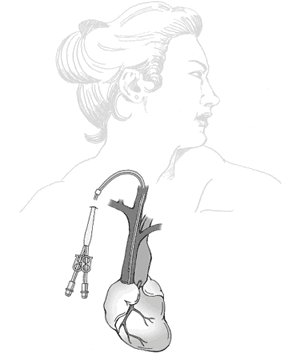
Catheter for hemodialysis

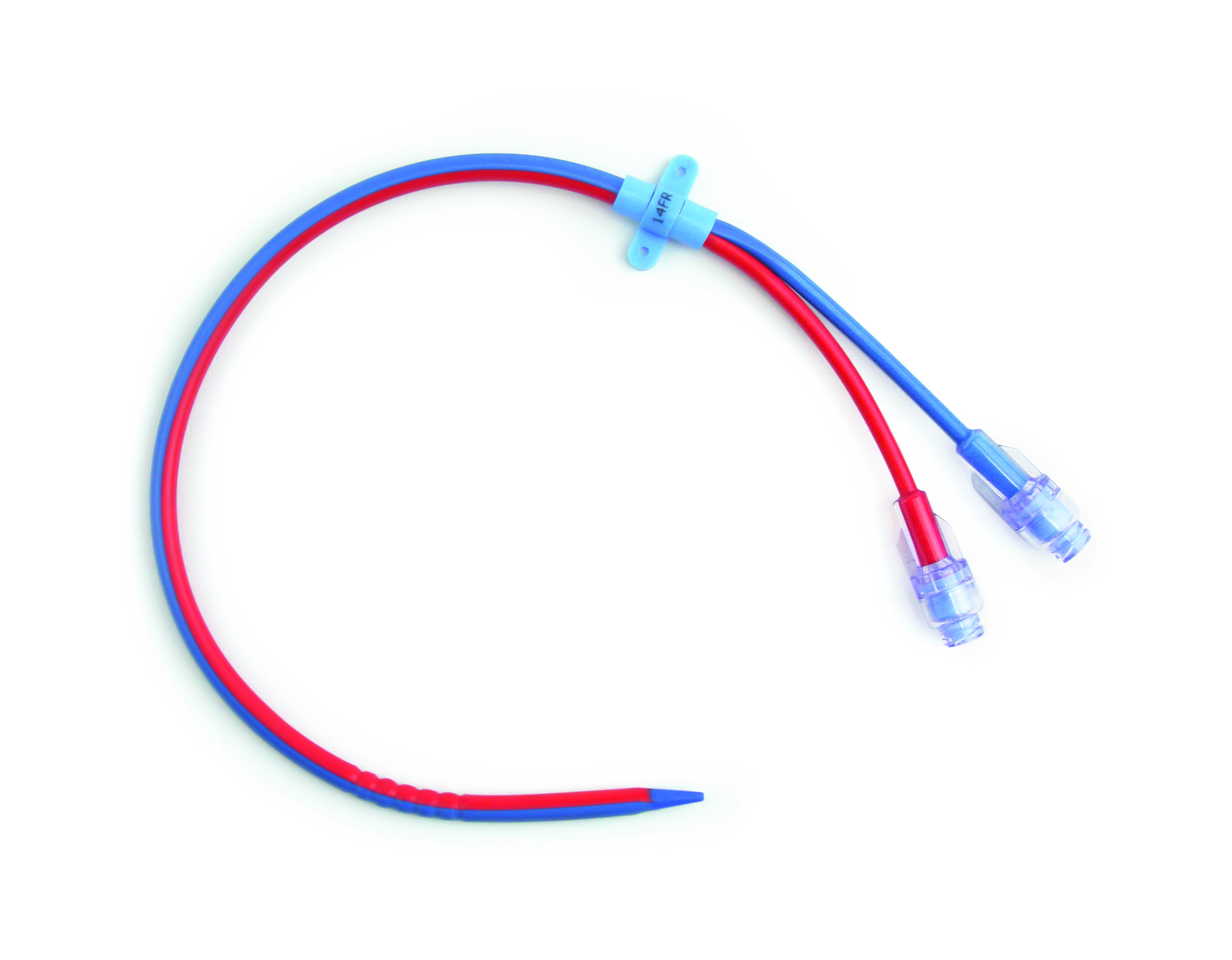
Central venous catheter for temporary access in hemodialysis

A dialysis catheter is a catheter used for exchanging blood to and from a hemodialysis machine and a patient.

The dialysis catheter contains two lumens: venous and arterial. Although both lumens are in the vein, the "arterial" lumen, like natural arteries, carries blood away from the heart, while the "venous" lumen returns blood towards the heart. The arterial lumen (typically red) withdraws blood from the patient and carries it to the dialysis machine, while the venous lumen (typically blue) returns blood to the patient (from the dialysis machine). Flow rates of dialysis catheters range between 200 and 500 ml/min.

If a patient requires long-term dialysis therapy, a chronic dialysis catheter will be inserted. Chronic catheters contain a dacron cuff that is tunneled beneath the skin approximately 3–8 cm. The tunnel is thought to add a barrier to infection. The most popular dialysis catheter sold on the market today is the Symmetrical-Tip dialysis catheter. This catheter is in the form spiral Z shape.

== Types ==
=== Temporary access ===
Central venous catheters intended for temporary access (sin. Quinton catheters) are typically used for less than 21 days. These types of catheters are usually smaller in size, placed directly in the vein, and are two or three lumens in design. The third lumen is useful for administration of fluids, antibiotics, medicines, or contrast without having to find other places for intravenous access. This type of catheter is useful for initiating venous access for acute renal failure patients quickly for dialysis before a permanent catheter is inserted for long term access.

=== Permanent access ===
The lumens of this type of catheter is larger, have a cuff that tunnel under the skin away from the venous insertion site with only two lumens. The catheter course under the skin helps to prevent infection going into bloodstream, as seen in temporary catheters.

== Catheter placement ==
Common site of catheter placement is placed by puncturing the right internal jugular vein (IJV) in the neck, advancing into superior vena cava (SVC) towards the right atrium of the heart due to its straightforward path into the SVC. Alternatively, a SVC catheter can be inserted via the right external jugular vein (EJV) if right IJV is inaccessible. If both IJV and EJV are both not accessible, left IJV can be assessed. However, left IJV access is more difficult that right IJV because of its tortuous course to the SVC.

== Complications ==
Some common malfunctions of dialysis catheters include clotting, infection, and kinking. One of the most common errors of tunnel hemodialysis catheter insertions is failure to locate the arterial limb of the catheter medially and the venous limb laterally. This must be done, because most catheters have a memory in the plastic, which will cause the catheter to try to resume its natural straight form. If the arterial limb is placed laterally, this will cause the arterial inlet to float up against the vein wall, or even up against the rim of the inlet of the atrium. This has the same effect as a vacuum cleaner hose sucking up against curtains. This results in poor blood flows, and can force the dialysis staff to reverse flow, using the venous limb of the catheter as the arterial. This will result in more inefficient dialysis, as there will be admixing of blood from the catheter (cleaning the same blood, over again). A dialysis catheter must have infusion of 30cc or greater to keep the line open. Intravenous fluids at 30ml per hour should be hung if being used for infusion.

== Fistulas versus catheters ==
Surgically created arteriovenous fistulae are preferred over catheters for patients with chronic kidney failure, as the risk of infections (e.g., endocarditis, bacteremia), hospitalization and death are lower.
