= Navilyst Medical =

Manufacturer of vascular medical equipment

- Company type: Private
- Industry: Medical devices
- Founded: 2008
- Headquarters: Marlborough, Massachusetts, US
- Key people: Joseph M. DeVivo, CEO
- Products: PASV Valve Technology, Xcela PICCs and Ports, Vaxcel PICCs and Ports, Xcela PICC with PASV Valve Technology, NAMIC Fluid Management products and Exodus Drainage Catheters.
- Owner: Avista Capital Partners
- Parent: AngioDynamics, Inc.
- Website: www.navilystmedical.com

Navilyst Medical, Inc. is a manufacturer of vascular medical equipment, including catheters, ports, and embolization devices. The company name is based on the root navi (as in "navigation") and the suffix lyst (as in "catalyst").

== History ==
Navilyst Medical was founded in February 2008 after the $425 million Avista Capital Partners acquisition of Boston Scientific's Fluid Management and Vascular Access division. The acquisition was seen as a way to focus on "opportunities it sees with vein-access devices, instead of competing for resources with many other projects inside the larger company [of Boston Scientific]," primarily within the hospital realm. The purchase included Boston Scientific's manufacturing plant for NAMIC angiography and angioplasty fluid management devices in Glens Falls, New York.

In January 2012, news broke that vascular device manufacturer AngioDynamics, Inc. would be purchasing Navilyst for $372 million, calling the opportunity "an excellent platform for future revenue and earnings growth, as well as substantial cash flow generation." The purchase was completed on May 22, 2012, valued at $355 million. Navilyst Medical was allowed to continue as a subsidiary/division of AngioDynamics.

Changes arrived at the Glens Falls plant in December 2013 with the announcement of consolidation efforts with AngioDynamics' other facility in Queensbury. The company estimated 80 to 100 jobs would be shed over a period of three years, with the Queensbury plant being converted into a distribution center. A year later, the Glens Falls plant was hit with a warning letter from the FDA concerning faults with design control and real-time aging testing found during on-site inspections, though the company strove "to rectify the deficiencies promptly."
