= Robert Hickman =

Robert Hickman may refer to:

- Robert Hickman (footballer) (1942–2019), Australian rules footballer
- Robert O. Hickman (1926–2019), American pediatric nephrologist
