= Wayne Quinton =

American mechanical engineer and inventor

Wayne Everett Quinton (January 4, 1921 – January 22, 2015) was a developer of over 30 biomedical devices, including the Quinton catheter. He also invented a lightweight treadmill, for cardiac stress testing - the prototype of those used in fitness centers.

Quinton was raised in Rigby, Idaho. He received a degree in mechanical engineering from the University of Washington in 1959. He previously attended Ricks College (now BYU-Idaho) and Montana State University. A week after Pearl Harbor, he arrived in Seattle and began working for Boeing to work on the B-29 bomber. He was hired by the University of Washington for an Arctic Acclimatization study and subsequently as the sole member of the instrument shop.

Among Quinton's inventions was a shunt with Belding Scribner and David Dillard that allowed for repeated kidney dialysis procedures on an individual, making the process one that truly extended the patient's life expectancy. He was also involved with the following inventions: structure to allow polio patients to get into a sitting position; movable camera boom and cart to reduce time taking autopsy photos; uniform University of Washington lucite bubble oxygenator for use during open-heart surgery; hydraulic gastrointestinal biopsy instrument; Mitral valve finger knife for use during open-heart surgery; small aortic valve dilator for use during open-heart surgery; high-speed machine to test fatigue in artificial heart valves; Teflon tracheotomy plug to aid patients with paralytic polio.

Although Quinton was raised in a rural Mormon community, it wasn't until age 35 that he was baptized a member of the Church of Jesus Christ of Latter-day Saints.

Wayne Quinton died of congestive heart failure, age 94, at his home in the Highlands area of Seattle, Washington.
