= Robert O. Hickman =

Pediatric nephrologist and inventor (1926–2019)

Robert Othello Hickman (Monticello, Utah September 27, 1926–May 10, 2019) was a Seattle-area pediatric nephrologist and inventor of the Hickman catheter. He was a member of The Church of Jesus Christ of Latter-day Saints.

Hickman was raised in Logan, Utah. He served in the U.S. Air Force from 1945 to 1946. From 1947 to 1949 he served as a missionary for the Church of Jesus Christ in France. He married Lucy Jean Whitesides in 1950. He earned his undergraduate degree in anatomy from the University of Utah. He later received his medical degree from the University of Maryland School of Medicine. He did an internship with the University of Utah and a residency with the University of Washington, where he worked with Belding Scribner on hemodialysis.

He was part of a team that put the first patient in the world on kidney dialysis and broke ground developing catheters and shunts. The Hickman catheter is currently used to deliver medication intravenously, particularly to cancer patients, as well as for the withdrawal of blood for analysis.

In 1991, he took a three-year sabbatical to serve as a mission president for The Church of Jesus Christ. First he served over the Haiti Port-au-Prince mission. However a decision was made by higher up leaders to place that mission under a Haitian president due to worsening political instability, and Hickman was transferred to being president of the Raleigh North Carolina Mission. Seven years later, he took a second sabbatical as the doctor for the Brigham Young University Jerusalem Center, administering to about 800 students.

Hickman served in many positions in The Church of Jesus Christ. This included service as a bishop, stake president of the Lynnwood Washington Stake, stake patriarch and temple sealer.

Hickman and his wife Lucy were the parents of six children.

== Awards and recognition ==
The University of Washington Medical Center has endowed a chair in his honor.
