= Groshong line =

Type of intravenous catheter

Central venous access device (nontunneled)

A Groshong line is a type of intravenous catheter used for central venous access. It can be tunneled or non-tunneled.

== Application ==
Groshongs may be left in place for extended periods and are used when long-term intravenous therapy is needed, such as for chemotherapy. Similar to the Hickman line, the tip of the catheter is in the superior vena cava, and the catheter is tunneled under the skin to an incision on the chest wall, where the distal end of the catheter exits the body.

In contrast to the Hickman line, the tip of a Groshong line has a three-way valve, which is formed by a slit in the sidewall of the catheter tip. The valve opens outward during infusion, and opens inward during blood aspiration. When not being accessed, the valve remains closed.

== Handling ==
The insertion of a central Groshong line is usually done under local anesthetic by an interventional anaesthesiologist, interventional radiologist or surgeon. Throughout the procedure, ultrasound and X-rays may be used to confirm placement. When a central venous catheter is inserted, a chest radiologic examination is usually performed to confirm the position of the catheter and absence of pneumothorax. The chest radiologic examination is integral to the procedure.

Groshong catheters come in PICC line variations as well.

The Groshong catheter is a trademark of Bard Access Systems.

The device is named after its inventor, LeRoy E. Groshong, MD, a surgical oncologist based in Oregon.

== See also ==
- Broviac catheter
- Central venous line
