= Northwest Kidney Centers =

US non-profit kidney dialysis provider

Coordinates: 47.6253°N 122.3208°W

- Northwest Kidney Centers’ kidney resource center at 700 Broadway, Seattle, Washington, includes a dialysis museum
- Type: Non-profit organization
- Industry: Health care
- Founded: Seattle, Washington, United States (1962)
- Founder: Dr. Belding H. Scribner; Dr. James W. Haviland
- Headquarters: Seattle, Washington, United States
- Area served: King County and Clallam County, Washington
- Key people: Rebecca Fox (President and CEO); Matthew Rivara, MD (Chief Medical Officer)
- Website: nwkidney.org

Northwest Kidney Centers is a regional, not-for-profit community-based provider of kidney dialysis, public health education, and research into the causes and treatments of chronic kidney disease. Established in Seattle in 1962, it was the world's first out-of-hospital dialysis provider. It offers dialysis throughout the greater Seattle area in 20 free-standing clinics, eight hospitals and its home dialysis program. It opened its first clinic in Everett in 2020, the organization's first in Snohomish county.

Nearly 80 percent of people on dialysis in King County go to Northwest Kidney Centers for their treatment. The organization's 727-member staff provided 284,511 treatments in 2019, about a quarter of all dialysis treatments in the state. Northwest Kidney Centers operates the oldest home dialysis program in the United States, currently training 275 people to give themselves dialysis at home.

Northwest Kidney Centers’ model of providing dialysis outside of a hospital setting has spread throughout the world. According to a United States Renal Data System 2013 report, there are 6,009 outpatient dialysis clinics in the United States.

Compared to national averages, Northwest Kidney Centers patients live longer, have fewer complications, spend less time in the hospital and receive more kidney transplants.

== History ==
=== Early years ===
In 1960, kidney failure was fatal. This changed when Dr. Belding H. Scribner of the University of Washington developed the Scribner shunt, a blood access device that made long-term dialysis possible for the first time.

Scribner turned to the King County Medical Society president, James W. Haviland, for sponsorship of a community-supported outpatient dialysis center. Haviland marshaled support, drawing on his association with the University of Washington and his "clinical sense, wisdom, political acumen and knowledge" of the Seattle community to ensure that the new center operated on a not-for-profit basis.

In 1962, Haviland and Scribner launched the Seattle Artificial Kidney Center, which changed its name to Northwest Kidney Center in 1970 when its services spread beyond Seattle. The name changed again, to Northwest Kidney Centers, in 1992 when there were multiple locations.

In 1964, Time magazine reported that to treat 11 patients, the Seattle Artificial Kidney Center had a staff of two full-time physicians and one half-time physician, plus five nurses and five technicians. During these early years of hemodialysis, funding was extremely limited, requiring rationed access to the few available dialysis machines. A committee of physicians screened potential patients first by strict medical criteria. Patients who passed the initial medical screening were then further reviewed by an anonymous lay committee that decided who would get treatment.

In 1962, Life magazine published an article on the Seattle dialysis screening committee, which it dubbed the “Life or Death Committee.” The discussion the article generated led to the development of biomedical ethics as a field of professional study. In 1964, Scribner's presidential address to the American Society for Artificial Internal Organs discussed the problems of patient selection, termination of treatment, patient suicide, death with dignity, and selection for transplantation.

=== Early milestones ===
By 1964, Seattle Artificial Kidney Center had expanded to 10 stations serving 47 patients—growth that led to financial strain. In response, Scribner and his team developed home hemodialysis, training patients to treat themselves from home, reducing operational costs.

In 1972, the U.S. Congress passed legislation authorizing the end-stage renal disease program of Medicare. Section 299I of Public Law 92-603, on October 30, 1972, extended Medicare coverage to over 90 percent of Americans if they had permanent kidney failure and therefore required dialysis or kidney transplantation to live. This funding led to wider availability of dialysis nationally and spurred the growth of Northwest Kidney Center.

In 1978, Northwest Kidney Center began offering peritoneal dialysis in addition to its hemodialysis services: first, continuous ambulatory peritoneal dialysis (CAPD) and later automated peritoneal dialysis (APD).

Together with the Puget Sound Blood Center and the University of Washington Department of Orthopedics, Northwest Kidney Center jointly founded the Northwest Tissue Center in 1988. Housed at the blood center, the tissue center provided human bone, tendons, skin and other tissues for transplantation.

== Present work ==
Northwest Kidney Centers opened three new dialysis clinics in 2018, two in Federal Way and one in Fife, Washington. In 2019, it opened a clinic in Rainier Beach, Wash. and in 2020 it opened a clinic in Everett, Wash., its first in Snohomish county.

As a nonprofit supported by financial donors, Northwest Kidney Centers is able to provide supplementary services in addition to kidney dialysis. These include special care for the most fragile patients, free health education for people at every stage of kidney disease, patient access to dental care, staff scholarships, fellowships for doctors doing advanced kidney study, and funding for research.

Northwest Kidney Centers’ full-service outpatient renal-specialty pharmacy, one of the first in the nation, serves people with advancing chronic kidney disease, on dialysis, or living with a kidney transplant.

In 2008, Northwest Kidney Centers collaborated with UW Medicine in the creation of the Kidney Research Institute. Funding from Northwest Kidney Centers helps equip and maintain laboratories and pay for preliminary investigations that pave the way for larger research grants. Northwest Kidney Centers donates clinical research space in its facilities where Kidney Research Institute investigators meet with patients.

In 2017, Nephrology News & Issues magazine ranked Northwest Kidney Centers as the 8th largest dialysis provider in the United States.

Also in 2017, Northwest Kidney Centers announced it would provide a $15 million grant over five years to UW Medicine's new Center for Dialysis Innovation to conduct research on innovative dialysis technologies.

=== Museum ===
On November 10, 2012, during its 50th anniversary year, Northwest Kidney Centers opened a museum and gallery dedicated to the history of the organization and of dialysis treatment. Located in Seattle, the museum showcases photos, artifacts, dialysis machines and equipment. In 2016, the organization established a professional archive to preserve and share its history.

=== Patient care ===
Northwest Kidney Centers provides 284,511 treatments a year for more than 1,833 people with kidney disease, representing about 80 percent of all dialysis care in the region. The organization treats patients in its 20 outpatient dialysis centers and in eight area hospitals. 275 of its patients choose home dialysis, with training and supervision from Northwest Kidney Centers. Its special care service provides additional nursing and assistance to very frail patients. In 2017, Northwest Kidney Centers launched the nation's first palliative care program in a dialysis organization.

=== Education ===
Northwest Kidney Centers provides free classes on issues related to kidney disease, including nutrition, types of dialysis treatment and kidney transplants. In 2017, more than half of new patients had attended a class before beginning dialysis. The organization also participates in events and health fairs throughout the year, and its nutrition experts not only counsel patients on the role of nutrition in preventing and treating kidney disease, they also contribute articles to professional journals and columns to community newspapers.

=== Research ===
Through its Kidney Research Institute, Northwest Kidney Centers conducts research into the early detection, prevention and treatment of kidney disease and its complications. The Kidney Research Institute has received more than $100 million in research funding, primarily from the National Institutes of Health, and published more than 1,000 scientific papers. More than 30 studies are actively underway. In 2017, Northwest Kidney Centers committed to a $15 million grant over five years to jumpstart the Center for Dialysis Innovation, which works on revolutionary new technologies.

== Innovation ==
As the world's first dialysis organization, Northwest Kidney Centers created protocols and procedures that were innovative in themselves. From its establishment in 1962, the organization has been a model in the kidney care field.

=== Home hemodialysis ===
In 1964, Scribner and his team developed a machine to provide home hemodialysis for the first time. The machine, first used by Seattle Artificial Kidney Center patients, became a model for today's dialysis machines.

=== EPO studies ===
In the 1980s, Northwest Kidney Centers was the first site chosen for human studies on a synthetic form of erythropoietin (EPO), genetically engineered and later marketed as Epogen by Amgen, Inc. Dr. Joseph W. Eschbach led the trials at Northwest Kidney Centers. His results, published in The New England Journal of Medicine in 1987, showed that artificial EPO reversed anemia in kidney patients. EPO hormone treatments have improved the well-being and quality of life of more than a million people with kidney disease.

=== Wearable artificial kidney ===
In 2014, researchers at the Kidney Research Institute received FDA approval for the first human study in the U.S. of the Wearable Artificial Kidney. Smaller and more portable than home dialysis machines, the device is worn like a tool belt, and it administers dialysis via a catheter. Northwest Kidney Centers dialysis patients are among the research trial participants.

== Awards ==
In 2009, President and CEO Joyce F. Jackson received Washington State Board of Health's 2009 Warren Featherstone Reid Award for Excellence in Healthcare for her leadership and dedication to Northwest Kidney Centers.

In 2010, Northwest Kidney Centers received the Washington State Hospital Association Community Health Leadership Award, which honors healthcare organizations that best serve their community's broad health needs. The award recognized Northwest Kidney Centers’ chronic kidney disease education program, offered free to the community.

In 2013, Northwest Kidney Centers was recognized in PR Daily's Nonprofit PR Awards for 2012's best traditional marketing campaign. The award cited 50th-anniversary initiatives in public health, public policy and public education.

In 2014, Seattle Magazine named CEO Joyce Jackson an Outstanding Health Care Executive as part of its annual Leaders in Healthcare Awards.

In 2015, Qualis Health named Northwest Kidney Centers as the recipient of its 2015 Award of Excellence in Healthcare Quality: Outpatient Services. The award recognized the nonprofit's Improving Kidney Transplantation Initiative's impact on improving health care quality and outcomes.
