= Central venous catheter =

Tubular device placed in a vein to administer medicines

- Diagram showing a non-tunneled central line inserted into the right subclavian vein.
- MeSH: D002405

A central venous catheter (CVC), also known as a central line (c-line), central venous line, or central venous access catheter, is a catheter placed into a large vein. It is a form of venous access. Placement of larger catheters in more centrally located veins is often needed in critically ill patients, or in those requiring prolonged intravenous therapies, for more reliable vascular access. These catheters are commonly placed in veins in the neck (internal jugular vein), chest (subclavian vein or axillary vein), groin (femoral vein), or through veins in the arms (also known as a PICC line, or peripherally inserted central catheters).

Central lines are used to administer medication or fluids that are unable to be taken by mouth or would harm a smaller peripheral vein, obtain blood tests (specifically the "central venous oxygen saturation"), administer fluid or blood products for large volume resuscitation, and measure central venous pressure. The catheters used are commonly 15–30 cm in length, made of silicone or polyurethane, and have single or multiple lumens for infusion.

== Medical uses ==
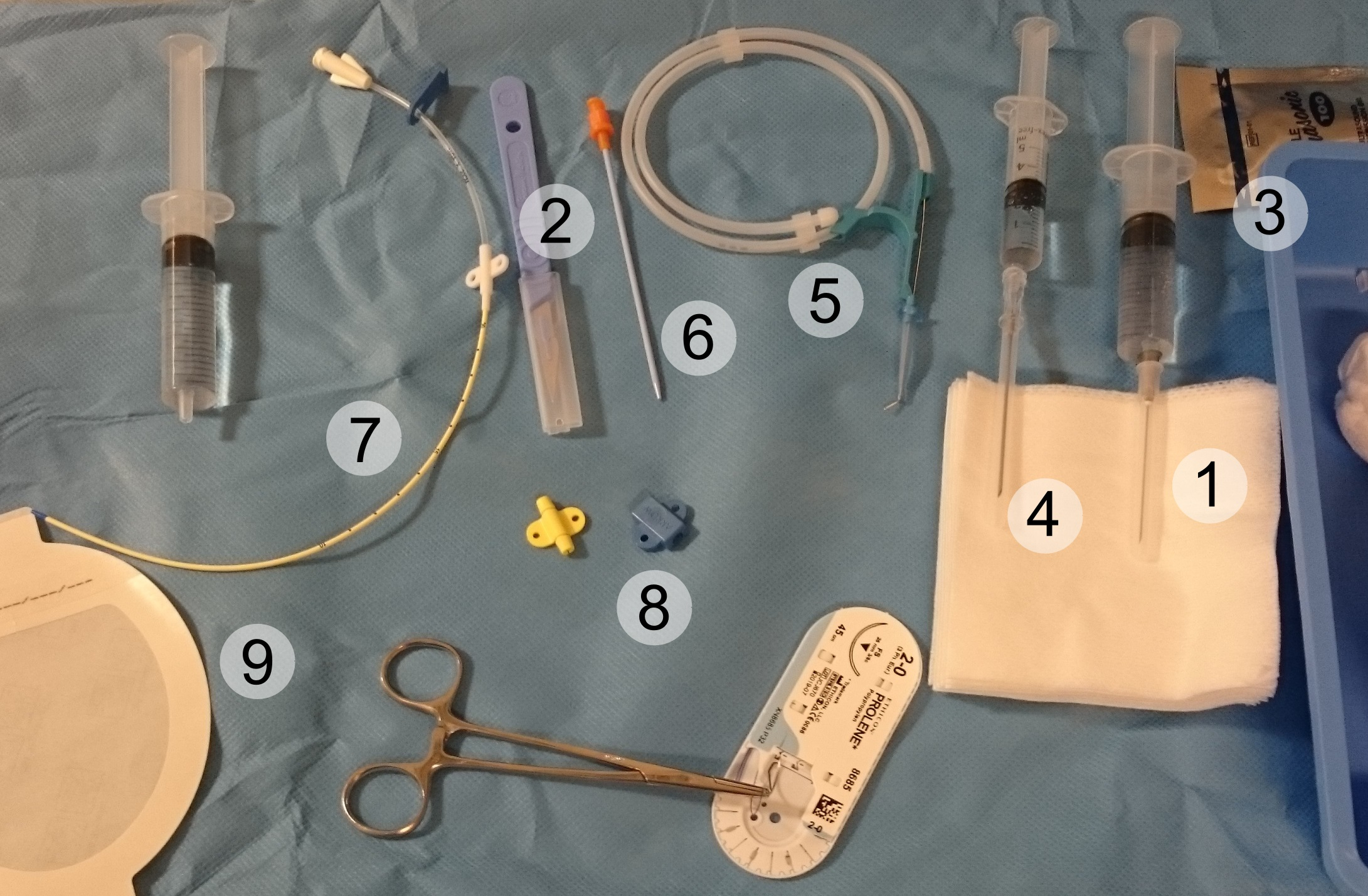
Central line equipment, in order of typical usage: 1. Syringe with local anesthetic; 2. Scalpel; 3. Sterile gel for ultrasound guidance; 4. Introducer needle (here 18 Ga) on syringe with saline to detect backflow of blood upon vein penetration; 5. Guide wire; 6. Tissue dilator; 7. Indwelling catheter (here 16 Ga); 8. Additional fasteners, and corresponding surgical thread; 9. Dressing

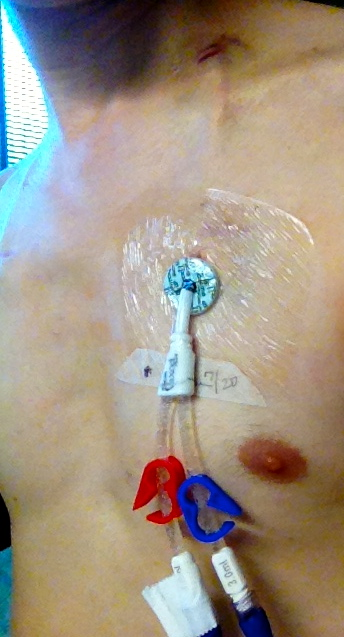
A dialysis two-lumen catheter inserted on the person's left side. Scars at the base of the neck indicate the insertion point into the left jugular vein.

The following are the major indications for the use of central venous catheters:

1. Difficult peripheral venous access – central venous catheters may be placed when it is difficult to gain or maintain venous access peripherally (e.g. obesity, scarred veins from prior cannulations, agitated patient).
2. Delivery of certain medications or fluids – medications such as vasopressors (e.g., norepinephrine, vasopressin, phenylephrine etc.), chemotherapeutic agents, or hypertonic solutions are damaging to peripheral veins and often require placement of a central line. Additionally, catheters with multiple lumens can facilitate the delivery of several parenteral medications simultaneously.
3. Prolonged intravenous therapies – parenteral medications that must be delivered for extended periods of time (more than a few days) such as long-term parenteral nutrition, or intravenous antibiotics are administered through a central line.
4. Specialized treatment – interventions such as hemodialysis, plasmapheresis, transvenous cardiac pacing, and invasive hemodynamic monitoring (e.g. pulmonary artery catheterization) require central venous access.

There are no absolute contraindications to the use of central venous catheters. Relative contraindications include: coagulopathy, trauma or local infection at the placement site, or suspected proximal vascular injury. However, there are risks and complications associated with the placement of central lines, which are addressed below.

== Complications ==
Central line insertion may cause several complications. The benefit expected from their use should outweigh the risk of those complications.

=== Pneumothorax ===
The incidence of pneumothorax is highest with subclavian vein catheterization due to its anatomic proximity to the apex of the lung. In the case of catheterization of the internal jugular vein, the risk of pneumothorax is minimized by the use of ultrasound guidance. For experienced clinicians, the incidence of pneumothorax is about 1.5–3.1%. The National Institute for Health and Care Excellence (UK) and other medical organizations recommend the routine use of ultrasonography to minimize complications.

If a pneumothorax is suspected, an upright chest x-ray should be obtained. An upright chest x-ray is preferred because free air will migrate to the apex of the lung, where it is easily visualized. Of course, this is not always possible, particularly in critically ill patients in the intensive care unit. Radiographs obtained in the supine position fail to detect 25–50% of pneumothoraces. Instead, bedside ultrasound is a superior method of detection in those too ill to obtain upright imaging.

=== Vascular perforation ===
Perforation of vessels other than the intended target is a feared and potentially life-threatening complication of central line insertion. Fortunately, the incidence of these events is exceedingly rare, especially when lines are placed with ultrasound guidance. Accidental cannulation of the carotid artery is a potential complication of placing a central line in the internal jugular vein. This occurs at a rate of approximately 1% when ultrasound guidance is used. However, it has a reported incidence of 0.5–11% when an anatomical approach is used. If the carotid is accidentally cannulated and a catheter is inserted into the artery, the catheter should be left in place and a vascular surgeon should be notified because removing it can be fatal.

=== Catheter-related bloodstream infections ===
All catheters can introduce bacteria into the bloodstream. This can result in serious infections that can be fatal in up to 25% of cases. The problem of central line-associated bloodstream infections (CLABSI) has gained increasing attention in recent years. They cause a great deal of morbidity (harm) and deaths, and increase health care costs. Those who have a CLABSI have a 2.75 times increased risk of dying compared to those who do not. CLABSI is also associated with longer intensive care unit and hospital stays, at 2.5 and 7.5 days respectively when other illness related factors are adjusted for.

Microbes can gain access to the bloodstream via a central catheter a number of ways. Rarely, they are introduced by contaminated infusions. They might also gain access to the lumen of the catheter through break points such as hubs. However, the method by which most organisms gain access is by migrating from the skin along the portion of the catheter tracking through subcutaneous tissue until they reach the portion of the catheter in the vein. Additionally, bacteria present in the blood may attach to the surface of the catheter, transforming it into a focus of infection.

If a central line infection is suspected in a person, blood cultures are taken from both the catheter and a vein elsewhere in the body. If the culture from the central line grows bacteria much earlier (>2 hours) than the other vein site, the line is likely infected. Quantitative blood culture is even more accurate, but this method is not widely available.

Antibiotics are nearly always given as soon as a patient is suspected to have a catheter-related bloodstream infection. However, this must occur after blood cultures are drawn, otherwise the culprit organism may not be identified. The most common organisms causing these infections are coagulase negative staphylococci such as Staphylococcus epidermidis. Infections resulting in bacteremia from Staphylococcus aureus require removal of the catheter and antibiotics. If the catheter is removed without giving antibiotics, 38% of people may still develop endocarditis. Evidence suggests that there may not be any benefit associated with giving antibiotics before a long-term central venous catherter is inserted in cancer patients and this practice may not prevent gram positive catheter-related infections. However, for people who require long-term central venous catheters who are at a higher risk of infection, for example, people with cancer who at are risk of neutropenia due to their chemotherapy treatment or due to the disease, flushing the catheter with a solution containing an antibiotic and heparin may reduce catheter-related infections.

In a clinical practice guideline, the American Centers for Disease Control and Prevention recommends against routine culturing of central venous lines upon their removal. The guideline makes several other recommendations to prevent line infections.

To prevent infection, stringent cleaning of the catheter insertion site is advised. Povidone-iodine solution is often used for such cleaning, but chlorhexidine appears to be twice as effective as iodine. Routine replacement of lines makes no difference in preventing infection. The CDC makes many recommendations regarding risk reduction for infection of CVCs, including:

- The preferred site of insertion (including for non-tunneled catheter placement), from an infection prevention point of view, is in the subclavian vein, and to generally avoid the femoral vein if possible.
- There is no clear recommendation for a tunneled catheter site in the guidelines.
- Selection of catheters should include those with minimal ports to accomplish the clinical goal.
- Sterile gloves are required for CVC
- Full body sterile drapes, cap, mask, gloves are required for placement of CVCs
- The catheter site should be monitored visually and with palpation (through dressing) on a regular basis to assess for infection.
- It is, however, acceptable to use clean, non-sterile, gloves for changing the dressing of intravascular catheters.
- Both chlorhexidine and povidone-iodine are acceptable skin cleansers, though chlorhexidine is preferred.
- For short-term CVC sites, dressings must be changed at least every 7 days for transparent dressings, and every 2 days for gauze dressings.
- For long-term implanted or tunneled catheters, dressings are to be changed no more than once weekly unless soiled or loose.
- Routine removal and replacement of a central venous catheter is not recommended. While central line catheters should be removed as soon as they are no longer necessary, scheduled removal and replacement, whether over a guidewire or with a new puncture site, has not been shown to be beneficial in preventing infections.
- Medication impregnated dressing products can reduce the risk getting catheter-related blood stream infection.
- There is inconclusive evidence whether longer interval of changing dressings for central venous access devices is associated with more or less infections.
- It is unclear whether cleaning the skin with antiseptics or without skin cleansing can reduce the rate of catheter-related bloodstream infections. The lack of clarity is due to the low quality of some of the studies used in the meta-analysis.

Using checklists, which detail the step by step process (including sterile techniques) of catheter placement has been shown to reduce catheter related bloodstream infections. This is often done with an observer reviewing the checklist as the operator places the central catheter. Having central line catheter kits (or a central line cart), which carry all of the necessary equipment needed for placing the central venous catheter, has also been shown to reduce central line related bloodstream infections.

Patient specific risk factors for the development of catheter-related bloodstream infections include placing or maintaining a central catheter in those who are immunocompromised, neutropenic, malnourished, have severe burns, have a body mass index greater than 40 (obesity) or if a person has a prolonged hospital stay before catheter insertion. Premature infants also have a greater risk of catheter-related bloodstream infections as compared to those born at term. Provider factors that increase the risk of catheter-related bloodstream infections include inserting the catheter under emergency conditions, not adhering to sterile technique, multiple manipulations of the catheter or hub, and maintaining the catheter for longer than is indicated.

=== Occlusion ===
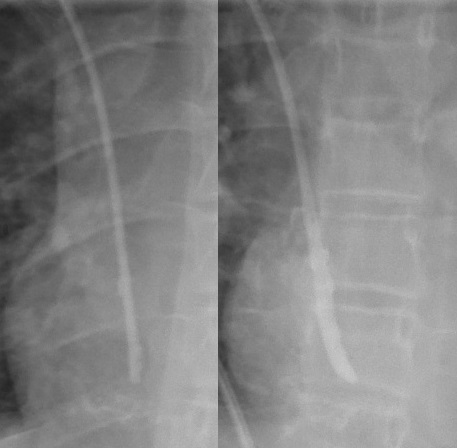
One form of thrombosis is the formation of a fibrin sheath around the catheter, and is one of the most common causes of catheter obstruction. It is indirectly seen in these images before and after radiocontrast infusion, as the radiocontrast collects around the catheter.

Venous catheters may occasionally become occluded by kinks in the catheter, backwash of blood into the catheter leading to thrombosis, or infusion of insoluble materials that form precipitates. However, thrombosis is the most common cause of central line occlusion, occurring in up to 25% of catheters.

CVCs are a risk factor for forming blood clots (venous thrombosis) including upper extremity deep vein thrombosis. It is thought this risk stems from activation of clotting substances in the blood by trauma to the vein during placement. The risk of blood clots is higher in a person with cancer, as cancer is also a risk factor for blood clots. As many as two thirds of cancer patients with central lines show evidence of catheter-associated thrombosis. However, most cases (more than 95%) of catheter-associated thrombosis go undetected. Most symptomatic cases are seen with placement of femoral vein catheters (3.4%) or peripherally inserted central catheters (3%). Anti-clotting drugs such as heparin and fondaparinux have been shown to decrease the incidence of blood clots, specifically deep vein thrombosis, in a person with cancer with central lines. Additionally, studies suggest that short term use of CVCs in the subclavian vein is less likely to be associated with blood clots than CVCs placed in the femoral vein in non-cancer patients.

In the case of non-thrombotic occlusion (e.g. formation of precipitates), dilute acid can be used to restore patency to the catheter. A solution of 0.1N hydrochloric acid is commonly used. Infusates that contain a significant amount of lipids such as total parenteral nutrition (TPN) or propofol are also prone to occlusion over time. In this setting, patency can often be restored by infusing a small amount of 70% ethanol.

=== Misplacement ===
CVC misplacement is more common when the anatomy of the person is different or difficult due to injury or past surgery.

CVCs can be mistakenly placed in an artery during insertion (for example, the carotid artery or vertebral artery when placed in the neck or common femoral artery when placed in the groin). This error can be quickly identified by special tubing that can show the pressure of the catheter (arteries have a higher pressure than veins). In addition, sending blood samples for acidity, oxygen, and carbon dioxide content (pH, pO_{2}, pCO_{2} respectively) (l.e.: blood-gas analysis) can show the characteristics of an artery (higher pH/pO_{2}, lower pCO_{2}) or vein (lower pH/pO_{2}, higher pCO_{2}).

During subclavian vein central line placement, the catheter can be accidentally pushed into the internal jugular vein on the same side instead of the superior vena cava. A chest x-ray is performed after insertion to rule out this possibility. The tip of the catheter can also be misdirected into the contralateral (opposite side) subclavian vein in the neck, rather than into the superior vena cava.

=== Venous air embolism ===
Entry of air into venous circulation has the potential to cause a venous air embolism. This is a rare complication of CVC placement – however, it can be lethal. The volume and the rate of air entry determine the effect an air embolus will have on a patient. This process can become fatal when at least 200–300 milliliters of air is introduced within a few seconds. The consequences of this include: acute embolic stroke (from air that passes through a patent foramen ovale), pulmonary edema, and acute right heart failure (from trapped air in the right ventricle) which can lead to cardiogenic shock.

The clinical presentation of a venous air embolism may be silent. In those who are symptomatic, the most common symptoms are sudden-onset shortness of breath and cough. If the presentation is severe, the patient may become rapidly hypotensive and have an altered level of consciousness due to cardiogenic shock. Symptoms of an acute stroke may also be seen. Echocardiography can be used to visualize air that has become trapped in the chambers of the heart. If a large air embolism is suspected, a syringe can be attached to the catheter cap and pulled pack in an attempt to remove the air from circulation. The patient can also be placed in the left lateral decubitus position. It is thought that this position helps relieve air that has become trapped in the right ventricle.

=== Catheter-related thrombosis ===
Catheter-related thrombosis (CRT) is the development of a blood clot related to long-term use of CVCs. It mostly occurs in the upper extremities and can lead to further complications, such as pulmonary embolism, post-thrombotic syndrome, and vascular compromise. Symptoms include pain, tenderness to palpation, swelling, edema, warmth, erythema, and development of collateral vessels in the surrounding area. However, most CRTs are asymptomatic, and prior catheter infections increase the risk for developing a CRT. Routine flushings may help to prevent catheter thrombosis. If there is catheter obstruction, thrombolytic drugs can be used if the obstruction is caused by clots or fibrin deposition. Anticoagulant treatment is indicated if the obstruction is caused by thrombus formation. There is inadequate evidence whether heparin saline flush is better than normal saline flush to maintain central venous catheter patency and prevent occlusion.

== Insertion ==
Video of an ultrasound-assisted central line insertion through the internal jugular vein

Before insertion, the patient is first assessed by reviewing relevant labs and indication for CVC placement, in order to minimize risks and complications of the procedure. Next, the area of skin over the planned insertion site is cleaned. A local anesthetic is applied if necessary. The location of the vein is identified by landmarks or with the use of a small ultrasound device. A hollow needle is advanced through the skin until blood is aspirated. The color of the blood and the rate of its flow help distinguish it from arterial blood (suggesting that an artery has been accidentally punctured). Within North America and Europe, ultrasound use now represents the gold standard for central venous access and skills, with diminishing use of landmark techniques. Recent evidence shows that ultrasound-guidance for subclavian vein catheterization leads to a reduction in adverse events.

The line is then inserted using the Seldinger technique: a blunt guidewire is passed through the needle, then the needle is removed. A dilating device may be passed over the guidewire to expand the tract. Finally, the central line itself is then passed over the guidewire, which is then removed. All the lumens of the line are aspirated (to ensure that they are all positioned inside the vein) and flushed with either saline or heparin. A chest X-ray may be performed afterwards to confirm that the line is positioned inside the superior vena cava and no pneumothorax was caused inadvertently. On anteroposterior X-rays, a catheter tip between 55 and 29 mm below the level of the carina is regarded as acceptable placement. Electromagnetic tracking can be used to verify tip placement and provide guidance during insertion, obviating the need for the X-ray afterwards.

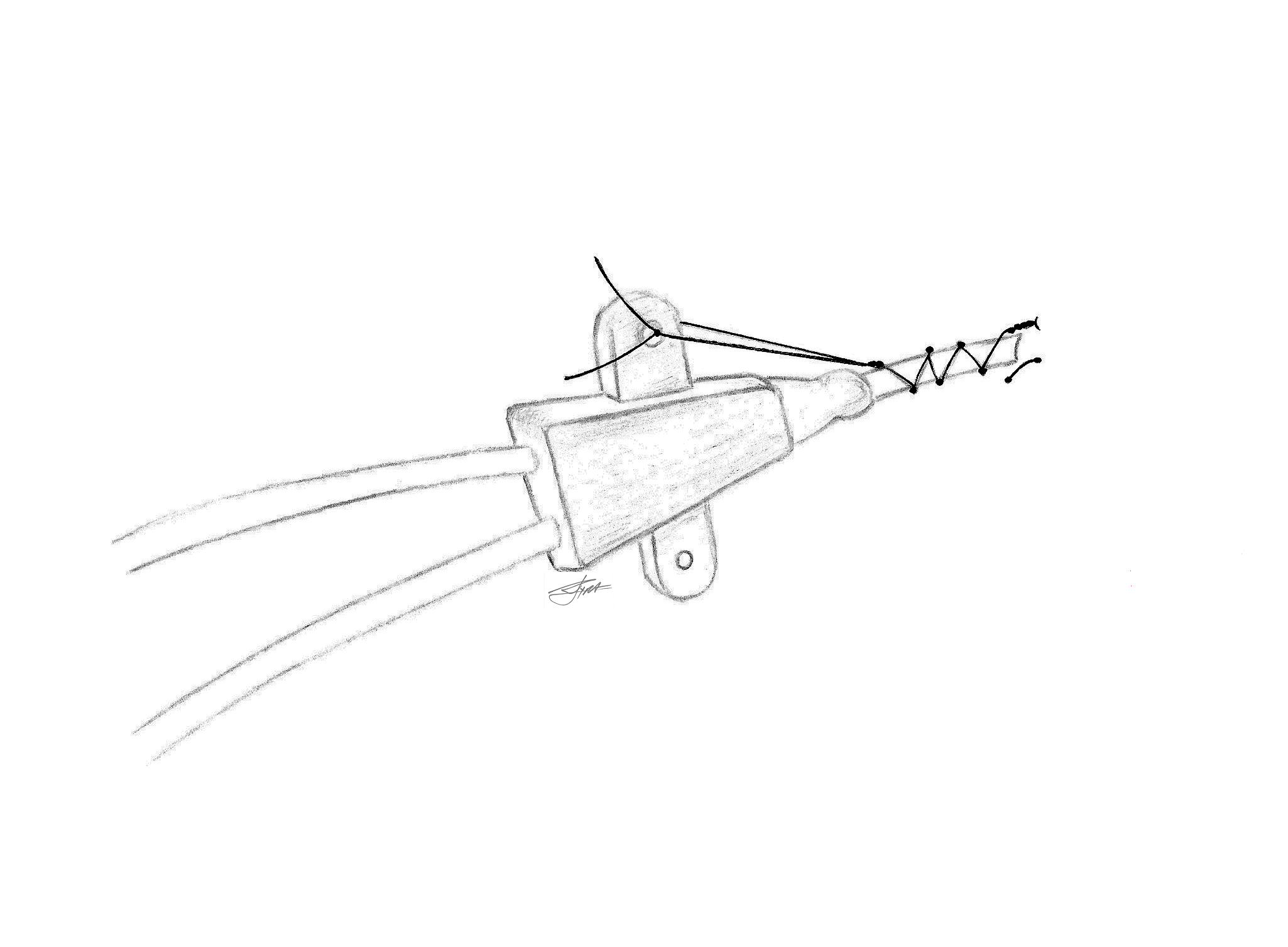
A central venous catheter secured to the skin with suture

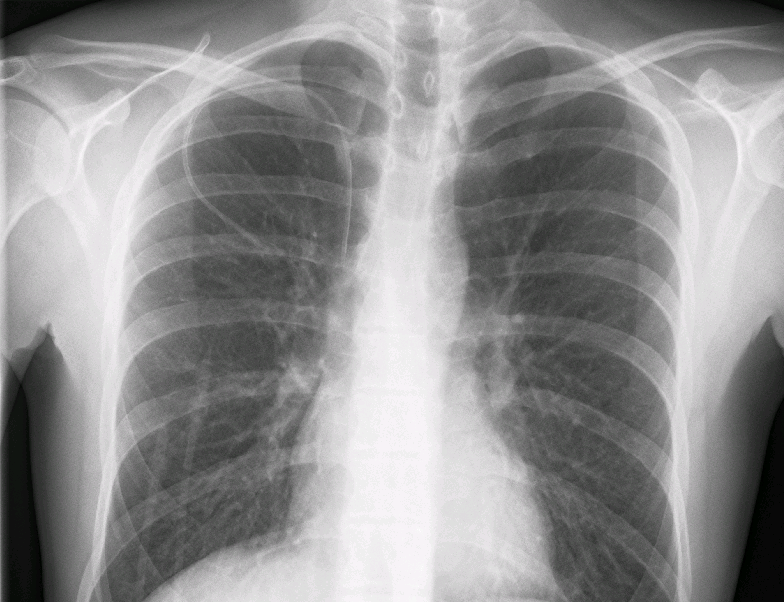
Chest x-ray with catheter in the right subclavian vein

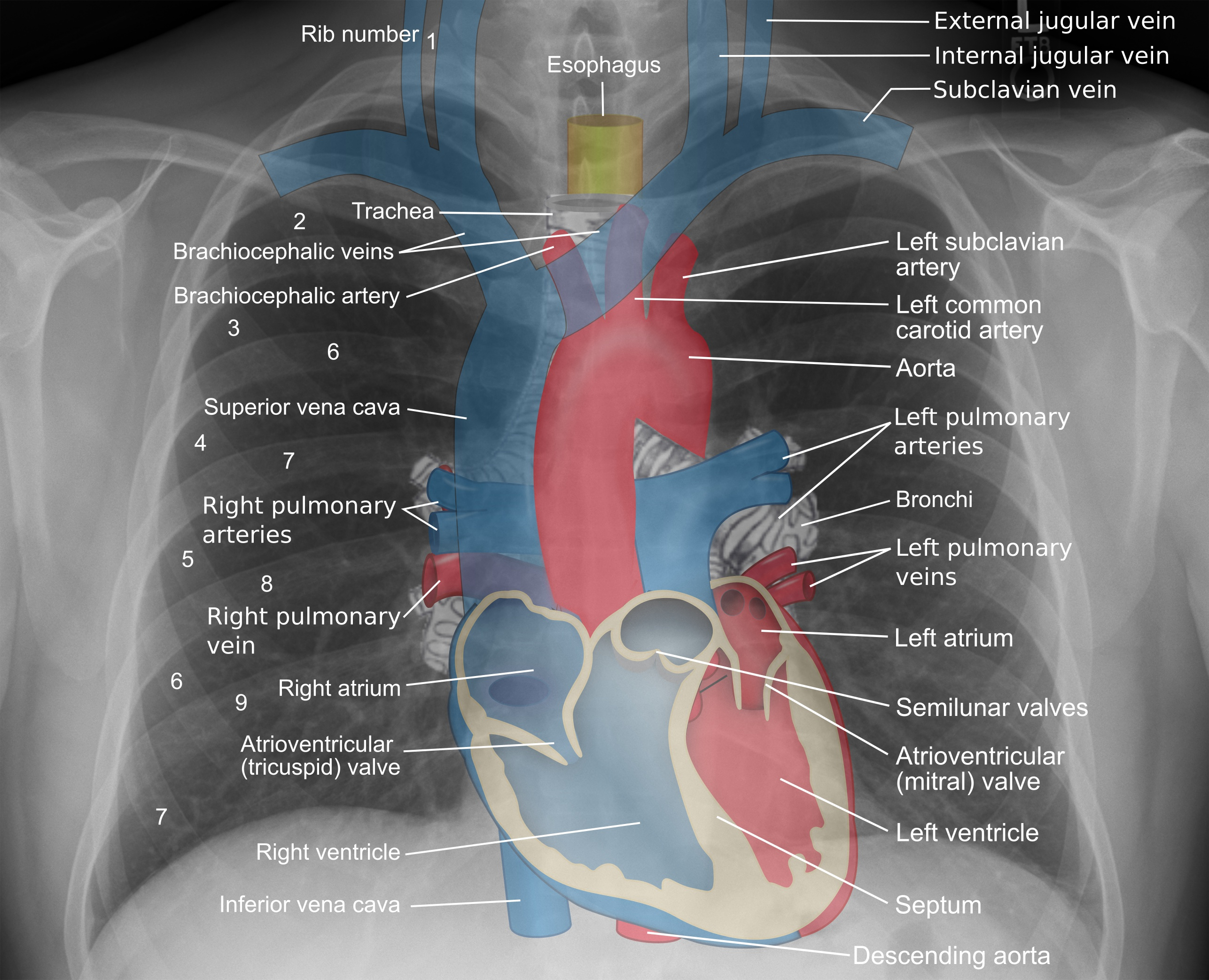
The outline of superior vena cava on a chest X-ray is labeled at left.

== Catheter flow ==
=== Hagen–Poiseuille equation ===
The Hagen–Poiseuille equation describes the properties of flow through a rigid tube. The equation is shown below:

$Q = \Delta P * (\pi r^4/8\mu L)$

The equation shows that flow rate (Q) through a rigid tube is a function of the inner radius (r), the length of the tube (L), and the viscosity of the fluid (μ). The flow is directly related the fourth power of the inner radius of the tube, and inversely related to the length of the tube and viscosity of the fluid. This equation can be used to understand the following vital observations regarding venous catheters: that the inner radius of a catheter has a much greater impact on flow rate than catheter length or fluid viscosity, and that for rapid infusion, a shorter, large bore catheter is optimal because it will provide the greatest flow rate.

== Types ==
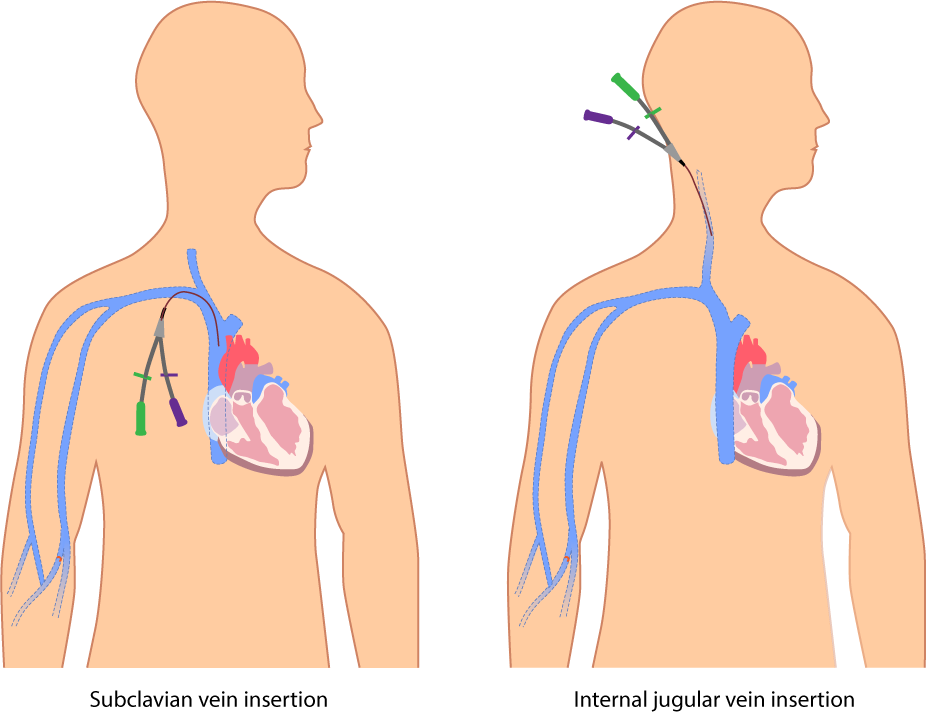
The percutaneous CVC is inserted directly through the skin. The subclavian (left), internal (right) or external jugular, or femoral vein is used.

There are several types of central venous catheters; these can be further subdivided by site (where the catheter is inserted into the body) as well as the specific type of catheter used.

=== By site ===
==== Percutaneous central venous catheter (CVC) ====
A percutaneous central venous catheter, or CVC, is inserted directly through the skin. The internal or external jugular, subclavian, or femoral vein is used. It is most commonly used in critically ill patients. The CVC can be used for days to weeks, and the patient must remain in the hospital. It is usually held in place with sutures or a manufactured securement device. Commonly used catheters include Quinton catheters.

==== Peripherally inserted central catheters (PICC) ====
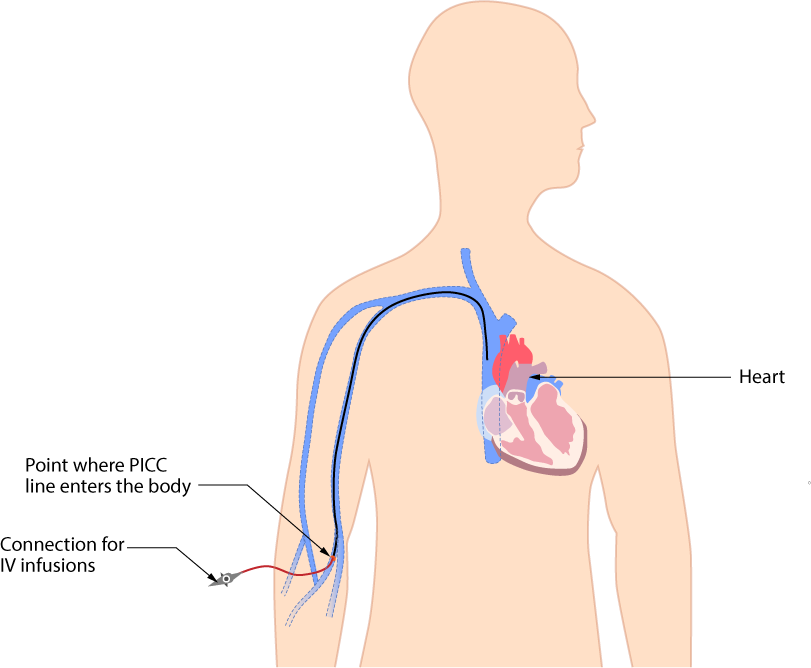
PICC line inserted in the upper arm (through the basilic vein)

A peripherally inserted central catheter, or PICC line (pronounced "pick"), is a central venous catheter inserted into a vein in the arm (via the basilic or cephalic veins) rather than a vein in the neck or chest. The basilic vein is usually a better target for cannulation than the cephalic vein because it is larger and runs a straighter course through the arm. The tip of the catheter is positioned in the superior vena cava. PICC lines are smaller in diameter than central lines since they are inserted in smaller peripheral veins, and they are much longer than central venous catheters (50–70 cm vs. 15–30 cm). Therefore, the rate of fluid flow through PICC lines is considerably slower than other central lines, rendering them unsuitable for rapid, large volume fluid resuscitation. PICCs can easily occlude and may not be used with phenytoin. PICC lines may also result in venous thrombosis and stenosis, and should therefore be used cautiously in patients with chronic kidney disease in case an arteriovenous fistula might one day need to be created for hemodialysis.

However, PICC lines are desirable for several reasons. They can provide venous access for up to one year. The patient may go home with a PICC. They avoid the complications of central line placement (e.g. pneumothorax, accidental arterial cannulation), and they are relatively easy to place under ultrasound guidance and cause less discomfort than central lines. PICC lines may be inserted at the bedside, in a home or radiology setting. It is held in place with sutures or a manufactured securement device.

==== Subcutaneous or tunneled central venous catheter ====
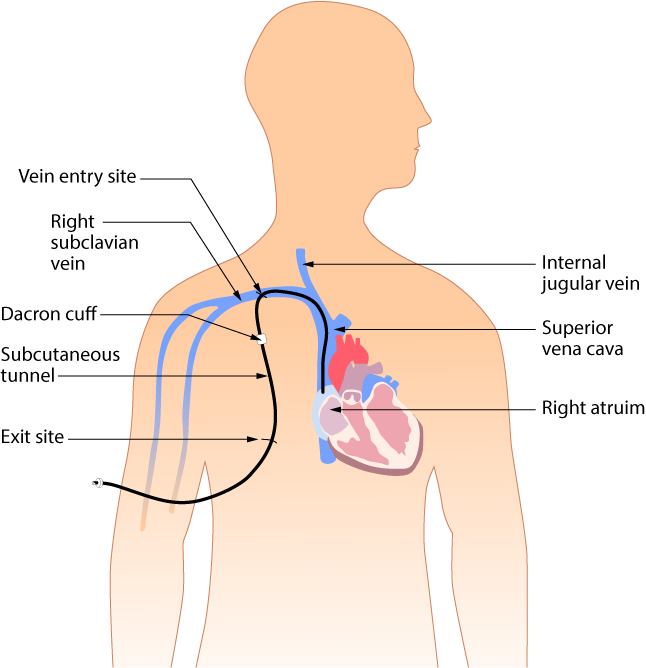
Tunneled CVC

Tunneled catheters are passed under the skin from the insertion site to a separate exit site. The catheter and its attachments emerge from underneath the skin. The exit site is typically located in the chest, making the access ports less visible than catheters that protrude directly from the neck. Passing the catheter under the skin helps to prevent infection and provides stability. Insertion is a surgical procedure, in which the catheter is tunneled subcutaneously under the skin in the chest area before it enters the SVC. Commonly used tunneled catheters include Hickman, and Groshong, or Broviac catheters and may be referred to by these names as well.

A tunneled catheter may remain inserted for months to years. These CVCs have a low infection rate due to a Dacron cuff, an antimicrobial cuff surrounding the catheter near the entry site, which is coated in antimicrobial solution and holds the catheter in place after two to three weeks of insertion.

==== Implanted central venous catheter (ICVC, port a cath) ====
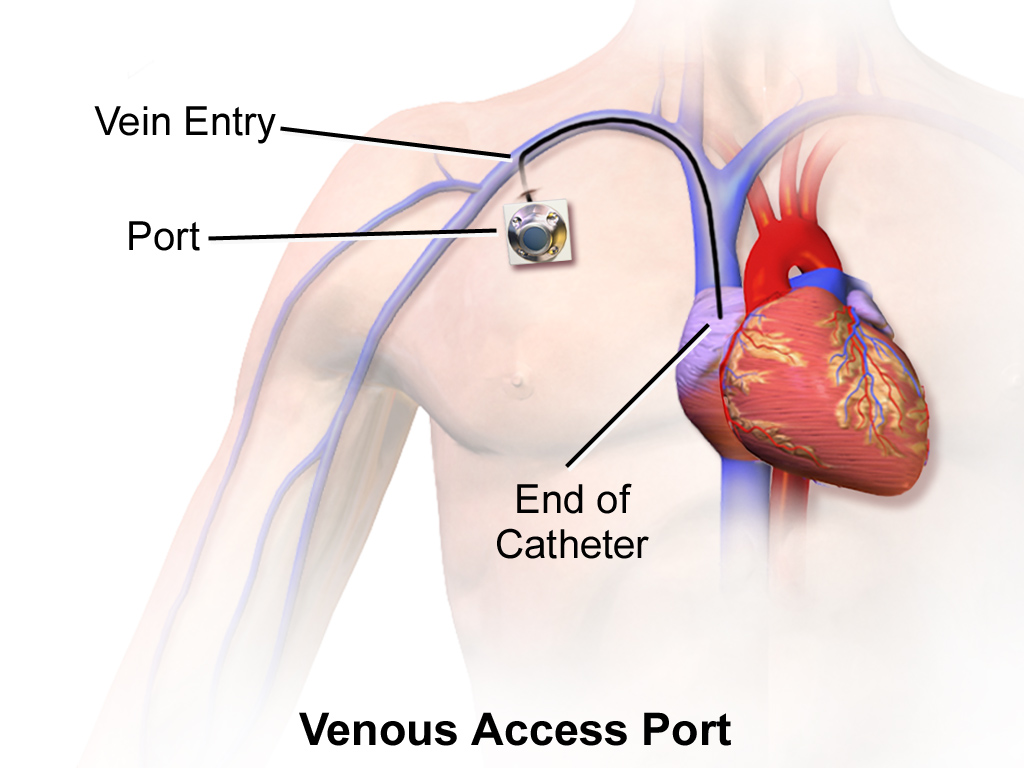
Implanted central venous catheter

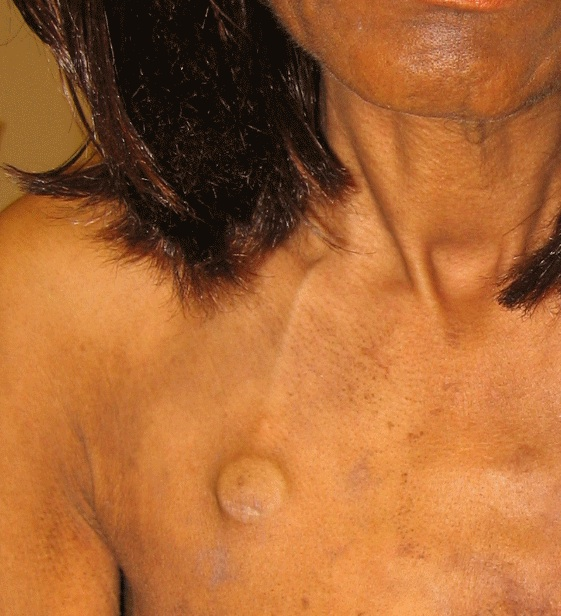
Implanted port. The "nipples" which define the clinician's target area are here readily discerned.

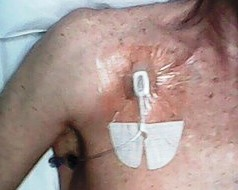
Gripper needle inserted in port

An implanted central venous catheter, also called a port a "cath" or "port-a-cath", is similar to a tunneled catheter, but is left entirely under the skin and is accessible via a port. Medicines are injected through the skin into the catheter. Some implanted ports contain a small reservoir that can be refilled in the same way. After being filled, the reservoir slowly releases the medicine into the bloodstream. Surgically implanted infusion ports are placed below the clavicle (infraclavicular fossa), with the catheter threaded into the heart (right atrium) through a large vein. Once implanted, the port is accessed via a "gripper" non-coring Huber-tipped needle (PowerLoc is one brand, common sizes are 0.75 and 1 inch (19 and 25 mm) length; 19 and 20 gauge. The needle assembly includes a short length of tubing and cannula) inserted directly through the skin. The clinician and patient may elect to apply a topical anesthetic before accessing the port. Ports can be used for medications, chemotherapy, and blood sampling. As ports are located completely under the skin, they are easier to maintain and have a lower risk of infection than CVC or PICC catheters. An implanted port is less obtrusive than a tunneled catheter or PICC line, requires little daily care, and has less impact on the patient's day-to-day activities. Port access requires specialized equipment and training.

Ports are typically used on patients requiring periodic venous access over an extended course of therapy, then flushed regularly until surgically removed. If venous access is required on a frequent basis over a short period, a catheter having external access is more commonly used.

=== Catheter types ===
==== Triple-lumen catheter ====
The most commonly used catheter for central venous access is the triple lumen catheter. They are preferred (particularly in the ICU) for their three infusion channels that allow for multiple therapies to be administered simultaneously. They are sized using the French scale, with the 7 French size commonly used in adults. These catheters typically have one 16 gauge channel and two 18 gauge channels. Contrary to the French scale, the larger the gauge number, the smaller the catheter diameter. Although these catheters possess one 16 gauge port, the flow is considerably slower than one would expect through a 16 gauge peripheral IV due to the longer length of the central venous catheter (see section on "catheter flow" above). The use of multiple infusion channels does not increase the risk of catheter-related blood stream infections.

==== Hemodialysis catheter ====
Hemodialysis catheters are large diameter catheters (up to 16 French or 5.3mm) capable of flow rates of 200–300 ml/min, which is necessary to maintain the high flow rates of hemodialysis. There are two channels: one is used to carry the patient's blood to the dialysis machine, while the other is used to return blood back to the patient. These catheters are typically placed in the internal jugular vein.

==== Introducer sheaths ====
Introducer sheaths are large catheters (8–9 French) that are typically placed to facilitate the passage of temporary vascular devices such as a pulmonary artery catheter or transvenous pacemaker. The introducer sheath is placed first, and the device is then threaded through the sheath and into the vessel. These catheters can also serve as stand-alone devices for rapid infusion given their large diameter and short length. When paired with a pressurized infusion system, flow rates of 850 ml/min have been achieved.

== Routine catheter care ==
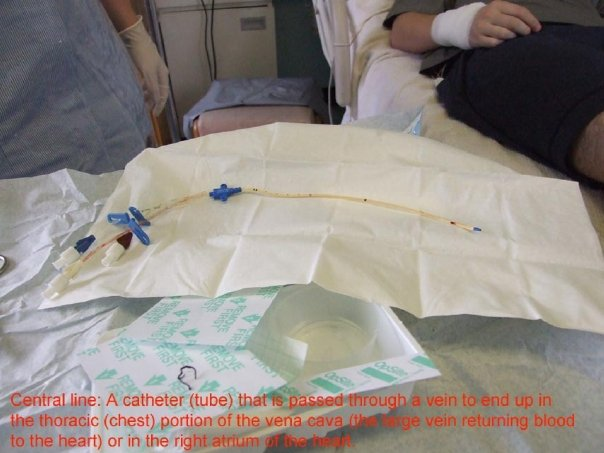
The most common central line inserted is the 7-French triple-lumen catheter in the picture. It is the workhorse of teaching hospitals and ICUs worldwide.

The catheter is held in place by an adhesive dressing, suture, or staple which is covered by an occlusive dressing. Regular flushing with saline or a heparin-containing solution keeps the line open and prevents blood clots. There is no evidence that heparin is better than saline at preventing blood clots. Certain lines are impregnated with antibiotics, silver-containing substances (specifically silver sulfadiazine) and/or chlorhexidine to reduce infection risk.

Specific types of long-term central lines are the Hickman catheters, which require clamps to make sure that the valve is closed, and Groshong catheters, which have a valve that opens as fluid is withdrawn or infused and remains closed when not in use. Hickman lines also have a "cuff" under the skin, to prevent bacterial migration. The cuff also causes tissue ingrowth into the device for long term securement.

== See also ==
- Peter Pronovost (Work with CVCs)
- Quinton catheter
