= Quinton catheter =

Medical device

A Quinton catheter is a large-bore, non-tunneled central line catheter in a central vein to give immediate access for hemodialysis or other high-flow blood therapies. Developed in the early 1980s as an all-silicone upgrade to the external Quinton–Scribner shunt, the device became the template for modern temporary and tunnelled dialysis catheters. The device is available in several French sizes (a measurement of catheter diameter), can be inserted through the neck, chest or groin, and delivers pump rates adequate for full intermittent hemodialysis. Because infection and clotting remain common, current guidelines regard it as a short-term bridge until a fistula, graft or peritoneal catheter can be established.

== History and development ==
The Quinton catheter is named after Wayne Everett Quinton (1921–2015), a bioengineer at the University of Washington who helped create hemodialysis access for patients with kidney failure. He worked with the physicians Belding Scribner and David Dillard to develop a surgically implanted device that allowed regular dialysis. Catheters bearing his name have been used for chronic dialysis since the mid-1980s.

== Design and variants ==
A Quinton catheter is a large-bore, double-lumen (having two separate channels) central venous catheter that provides rapid extracorporeal blood flow for hemodialysis, hemofiltration or plasmapheresis when permanent vascular access is not yet available. Developed in the early 1980s by the Quinton Instrument Company as a silicone-based successor to the external Quinton–Scribner arteriovenous shunt, the device popularised the concept of "permcath" and became a prototype for today's non-tunnelled "vascath" and tunnelled cuffed dialysis catheters. Modern lines are manufactured in sizes from 8 Fr paediatric sets to 14 Fr adult sets, incorporate arterial and venous lumens (inflow and outflow channels) separated by a septum, and may include a Dacron cuff that promotes fibrous ingrowth to anchor the tunnelled version and reduce bacterial ingress.

Advances since 2010 include step-tip, split-tip and symmetric-tip derivatives designed to reduce recirculation and shear, as well as surface modifications with heparin or antimicrobial agents aimed at lowering thrombosis and infection rates; early clinical series suggest modest flow improvements but no clear survival advantage over the conventional design.

== Insertion sites and dwell limits ==
Recommended insertion sites mirror other central lines: the right internal jugular vein is preferred for its straight course and lower stenosis risk, while short-term femoral placement is reserved for bedridden patients. KDOQI guidelines (Kidney Disease Outcomes Quality Initiative clinical practice standards) advise limiting non-tunnelled Quinton dwell time to fewer than 14 days in the neck and fewer than 5 days in the groin.

== Clinical uses ==
The catheter serves three main roles: (i) emergency renal-replacement therapy in acute kidney injury, (ii) interim access during maturation of an arteriovenous fistula or graft, and (iii) long-term access in patients unsuitable for surgical fistulisation because of severe vascular disease or limited life expectancy. Its paired lumens support pump flows of 250–400 millilitres per minute, allowing adequate clearance targets on intermittent dialysis schedules, while the silicone wall minimises thrombogenicity at the expense of some kink resistance.

== Complications ==
Major complications parallel those of other haemodialysis catheters: catheter-related bloodstream infection (overall incidence 2–5 per 1000 days of catheter use), intraluminal thrombosis, fibrin-sheath formation, central venous stenosis and mechanical dysfunction from kinking or malposition. Outcome studies summarised in recent reviews report primary patency rates (the proportion staying open and functional) of 50–70% at 90 days and infection-related removal in roughly 10–15% of catheters, figures comparable with other cuffed devices but markedly inferior to arteriovenous access. Consequently, contemporary guidelines frame the Quinton catheter as a bridge rather than a destination access and recommend prompt transition to fistula, graft or peritoneal dialysis once feasible.

== See also ==
- Central venous catheter
