= Peripherally inserted central catheter =

Catheter intended for long periods of use

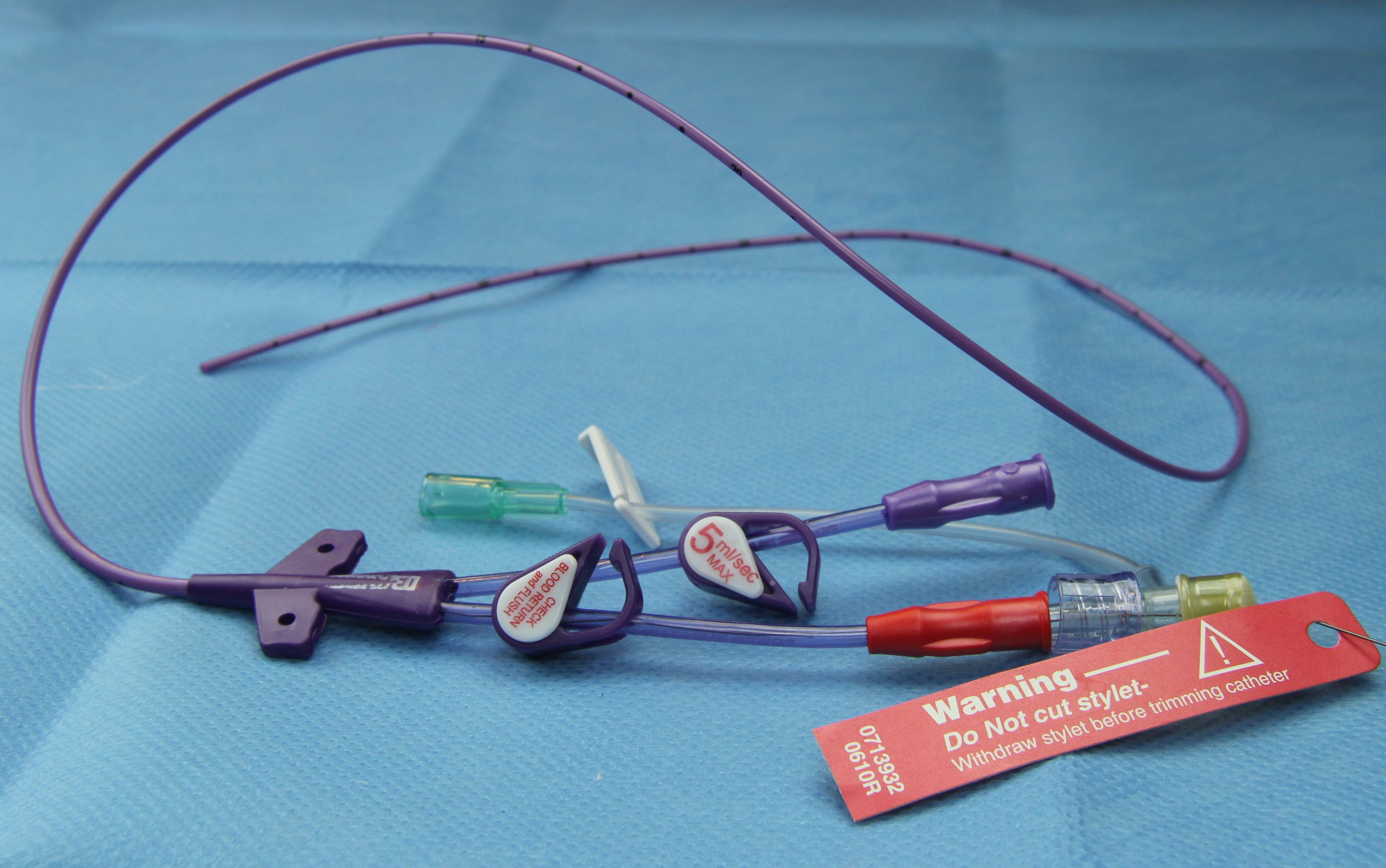
- Typical PICC line with a double lumen
- [edit on Wikidata]

A peripherally inserted central catheter (PICC or PICC line), also called a percutaneous indwelling central catheter or longline, is a form of intravenous access that can be used for a prolonged period of time (e.g., for long chemotherapy regimens, extended antibiotic therapy, or total parenteral nutrition) or for administration of substances that should not be done peripherally (e.g., antihypotensive agents a.k.a. pressors). It is a catheter that enters the body through the skin (percutaneously) at a peripheral site, extends to the superior vena cava (a central venous trunk), and stays in place (dwells within the veins) for days, weeks or even months.

First described in 1975, it is an alternative to central venous catheters in major veins such as the subclavian vein, the internal jugular vein or the femoral vein. Subclavian and jugular line placements may result in pneumothorax (air in the pleural space of lung), while PICC lines have no such issue because of the method of placement.

== Medical uses ==
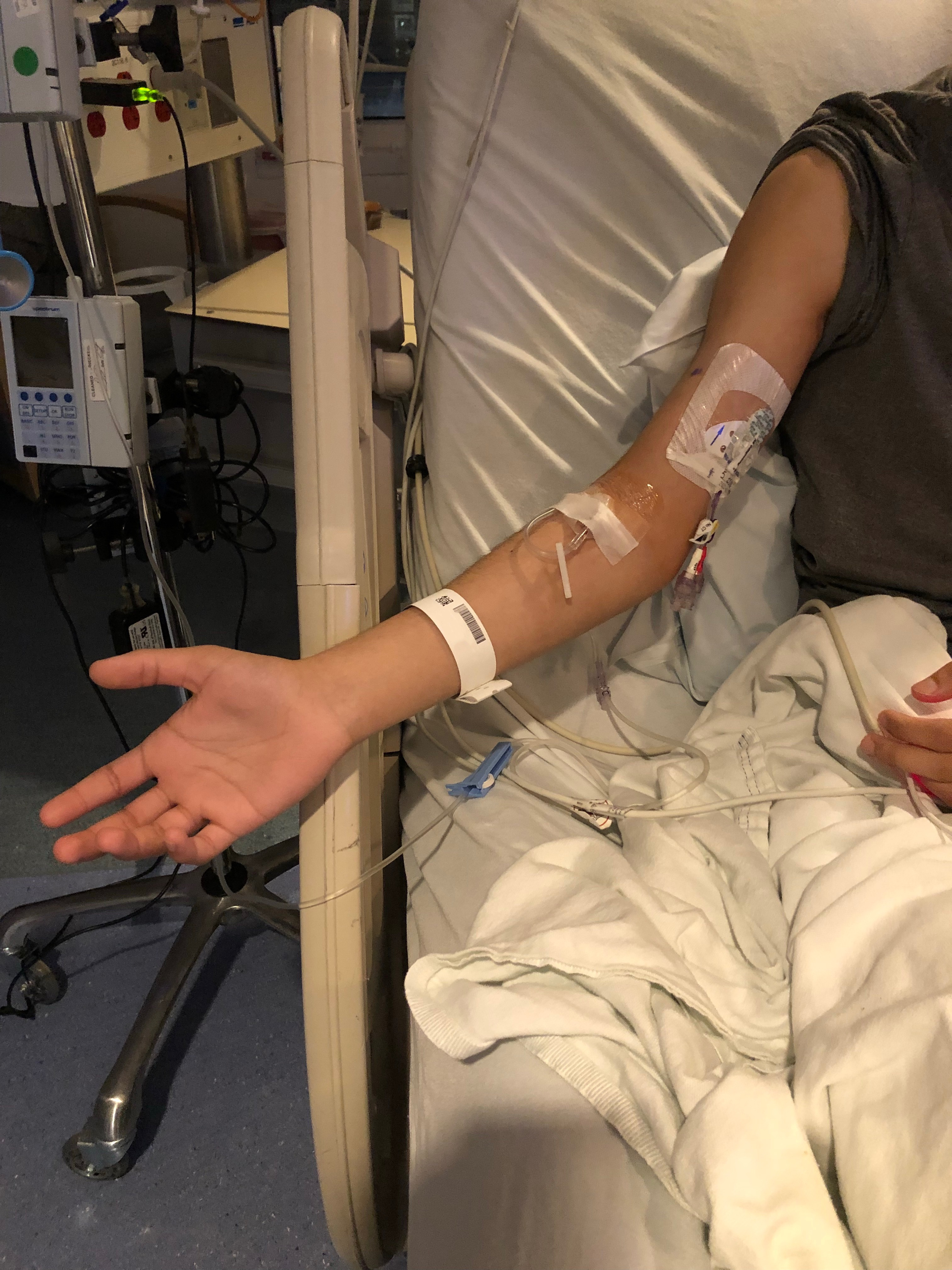
A PICC (upper arm) and IV line (elbow area) inserted prior to chemotherapy

Generally, PICC lines are considered when a person is expected to need more than two weeks of intravenous therapy. A PICC line can remain inserted for an extended period of time compared to other forms of central IV access, ranging from seven days up to several months as long as the line remains viable. They are utilized in both the hospital and community settings. They are commonly used in people receiving total parenteral nutrition (TPN), chemotherapy, or long term medications such as antibiotics. They may also be used to obtain a blood sample if the lumen is of sufficient size (at least 4 French gauge).

To help prevent the line from becoming clogged, the line should be regularly flushed with normal saline, and "locked" by filling it with heparin or normal saline when not in use.

== Contraindications ==
A PICC line may not be inserted in a part of the body which is burned or has a local infection. Damage to the skin and surrounding tissue from radiation may also prevent the placement of a PICC line.

== Risks and complications ==
A high rate of complications, with about 30% requiring premature removal, occurs with PICC lines when best practices are not followed, but can also be highly variable, e.g. due to patient population, with double‐lumens, EDs and chemotherapy associated with higher risks. This can be reduced to about 11% by best practices/systematic interventions; complication rates due to mechanical, thrombosis and infection issues can vary widely and catheter type can be a big factor.

As with any intravenous line, there is the risk for sepsis – a severe bloodstream infection that can be life-threatening. The majority of infections associated with PICC lines occur after a median duration of use of 10 days, and during an intensive care unit stay. Adhering to strict infection control procedures, including aseptic technique, when inserting or using a PICC line will reduce the risk of an infection. More effective PICC dressing and securement also reduces complications. There is also a risk of blood clots. The use of heparin to maintain a PICC line is not universal, as heparin locks have been associated with complications, including heparin-induced thrombocytopaenia.

Other complications may include catheter occlusion, phlebitis and bleeding. Urokinase or low-dose tissue plasminogen activator (tPA) may be required to break down obstructions, depending on the type and severity of the occlusion. A blood pressure reading can not be taken on an arm with a PICC line inserted.

== Technique ==
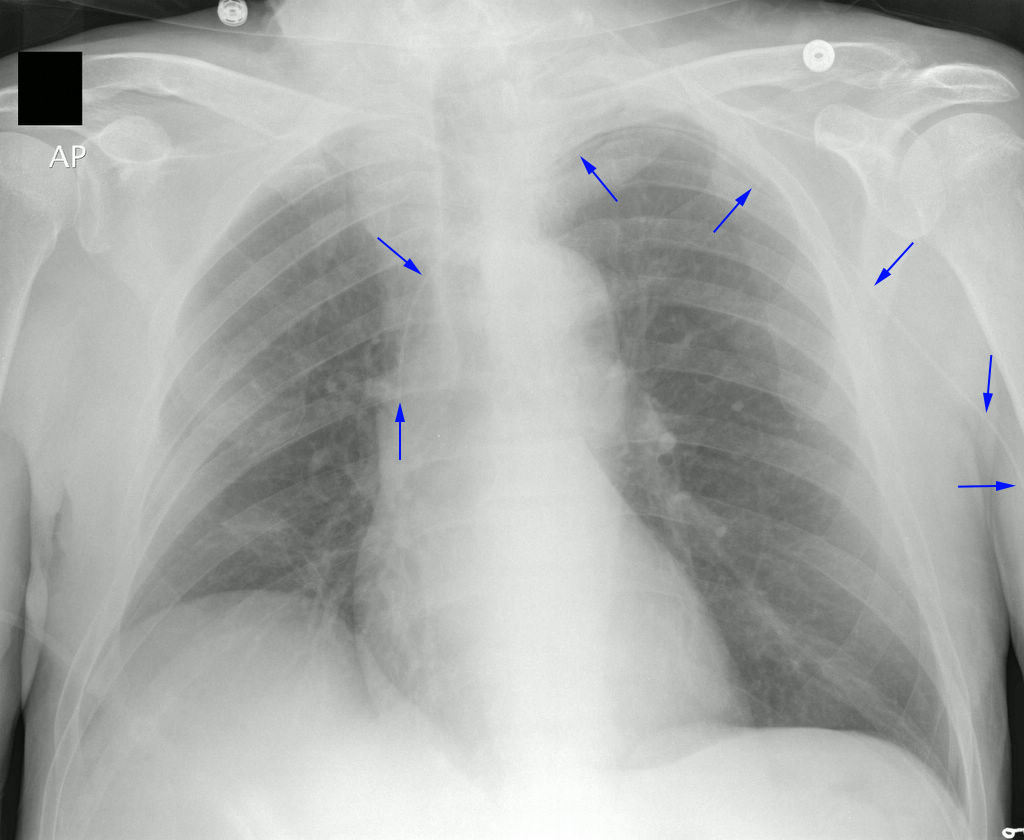
Chest X-ray showing tip of PICC line in the superior vena cava. Arrows provided to highlight the PICC line.

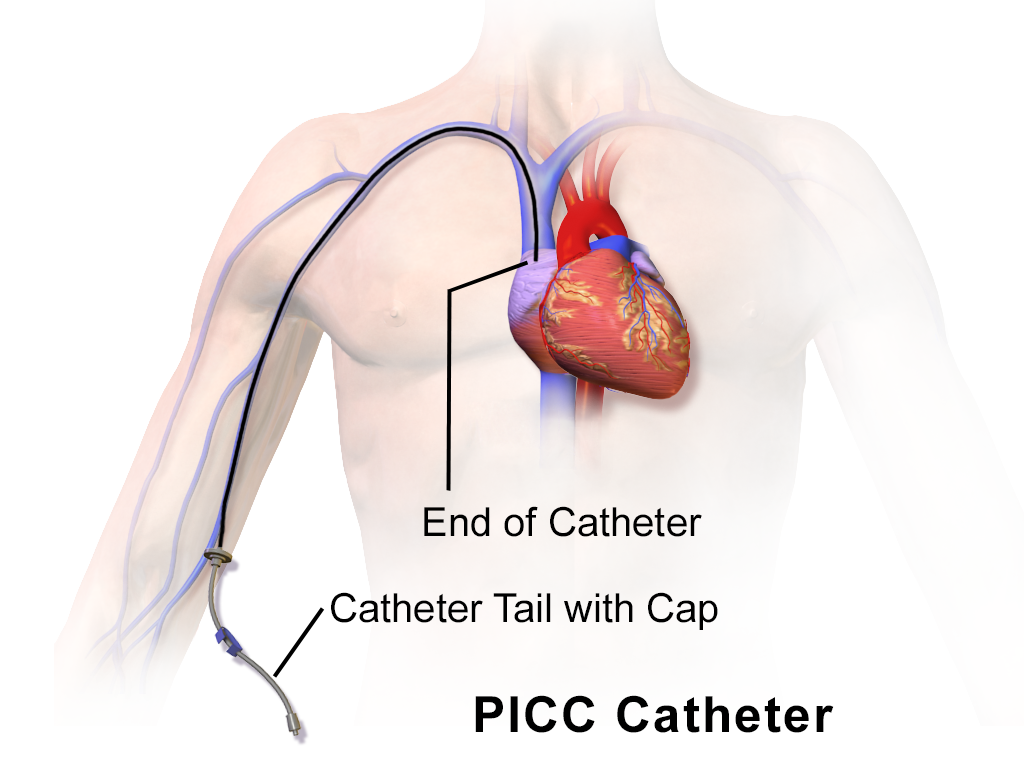
Illustration of fully inserted PICC

A PICC is inserted in a peripheral vein such as the cephalic vein, basilic vein or brachial vein in the arm, and then threaded through the veins toward the heart, until the end of the catheter rests in the proximal superior vena cava or cavoatrial junction. They must be inserted by a trained medical professional, including a physician, but also any trained medical professional such as a specially trained registered nurse or interventional radiology technogists. An ultrasound or chest X-ray, the use of fluoroscopy, or electrocardiography navigation can be used during insertion and to confirm placement. The insertion is a sterile procedure, but does not need to be performed in a completely sterile environment like an operating room.

=== Selection of vein and catheter ===
A PICC line is an invasive medical procedure, and may require local or general anesthesia during the placement. The basilic vein is an appropriate size, but is not preferred in children due to its depth and surrounding tissue. On the other hand, the cephalic vein may be used, though in some people it will not be possible to advance the line to the desired location through the cephalic vein. The brachial vein is large enough for a PICC line, but is also located close to other features such as the brachial artery and plexus. Imaging is commonly used to evaluate the length and path of the potential veins before the practitioner selects the most appropriate vein. The catheter size for PICC lines is generally measured in French gauge, and may range from 2 to 6. The number of lumens may vary from one to three, allowing for concurrent administration of different medications which cannot be mixed. Catheters are also manufactured from multiple materials, including silicone and polyurethane. The insertable portion of a PICC varies from 25 to 60 cm (9.8 to 24 in) in length, which is sufficient to reach the desired end position in most cases. Some catheters are designed to be trimmed to the required length before insertion whereas others are simply inserted to the needed depth with the excess remaining outside the body. Catheters are supplied with a guidewire. This wire is provided to stiffen the (otherwise very flexible) line so it can be more easily threaded through the veins, and is removed after insertion. Some PICC lines are manufactured with an antimicrobial coating intended to reduce the chance of an infection from the line, but these are not yet in widespread use.

=== Insertion ===
While an operating room is not required for the insertion of a PICC line, it is important to maintain a sterile environment surrounding the insertion site. This involves cleaning the skin around the site, as well as the use of a sterile gown, gloves, and drape to reduce the risk of environmental contamination. After the skin is prepared, an incision is made and a device called an "introducer/peelaway sheath" is inserted into the vein. The catheter is trimmed to the desired length if required, and filled with saline for the duration of the insertion. The PICC line is inserted via the introducer device, and threaded through the veins to the desired end location. Fluoroscopy or echocardiographic guidance may be used to monitor the tip position during insertion.

=== Removal ===
In most cases the removal of a PICC is a simple procedure. Generally, the catheter line can be safely and quickly removed by a trained nurse, even in the patient's own home, in a matter of minutes. After removal, the insertion site is normally bandaged with sterile gauze and kept dry for a few days, during which the wound can close and begin healing. Usually, a smaller adhesive bandage can be placed over the wound site after the gauze is removed if the wound is slow to heal. The tip of the catheter is sent for microscopy culture and sensitivity (MCS) if the patient is systemically unwell at the time of removal of the PICC. In certain units, it is sent as routine investigation.

== See also ==
- Central venous catheter
- Hickman line
