= Peripheral vascular system =

Veins and arteries not in the chest or abdomen

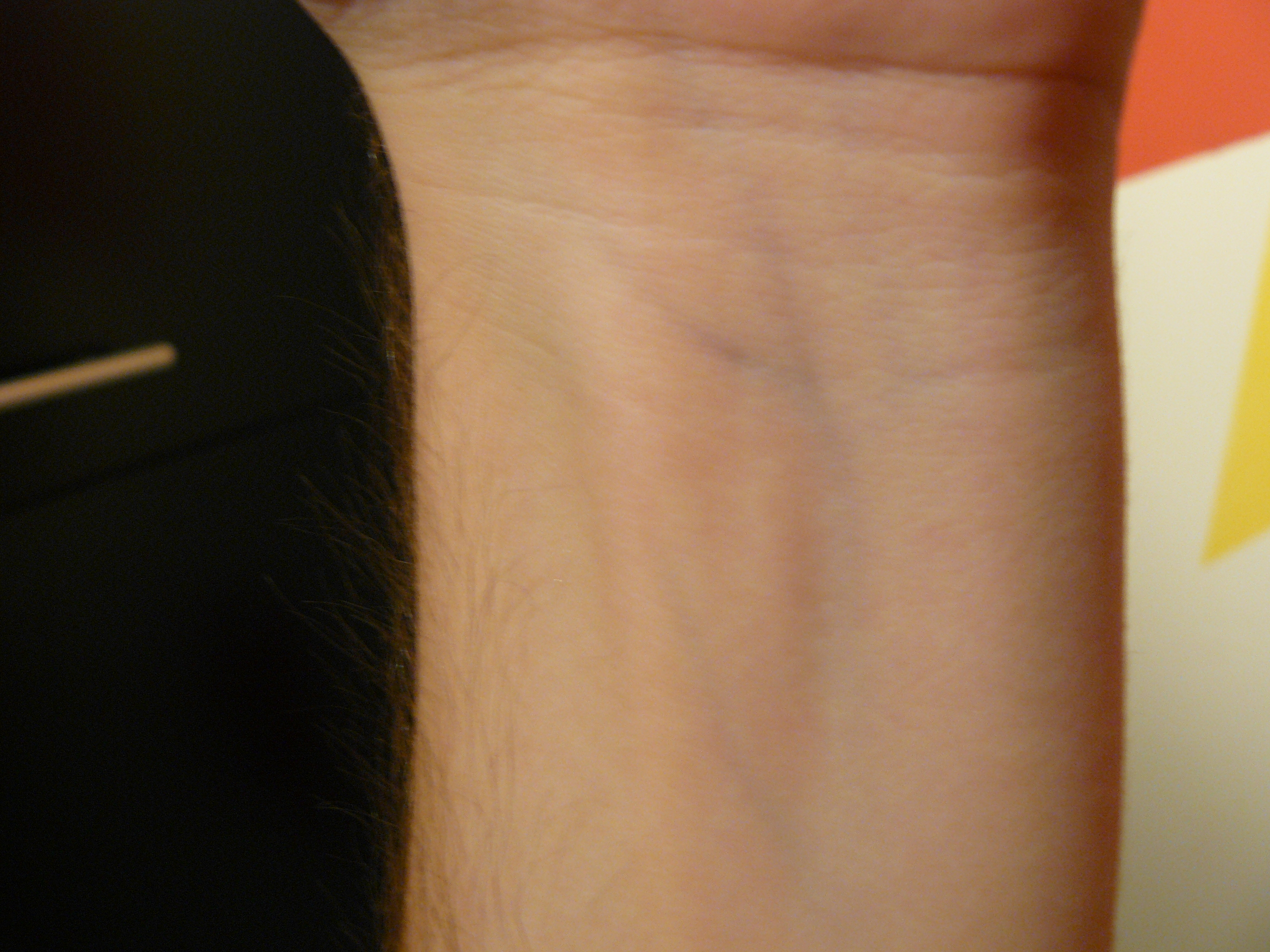
Image of a wrist with peripheral veins visible

The peripheral vascular system is the part of the circulatory system that consists of the veins and arteries not in the chest or abdomen (i.e. in the arms, hands, legs and feet). The peripheral arteries supply oxygenated blood to the body, and the peripheral veins lead deoxygenated blood from the capillaries in the extremities back to the heart.

Peripheral veins are the most common intravenous access method in both hospitals and paramedic services for a peripheral intravenous (IV) line for intravenous therapy.

In some cases blockages in the peripheral arteries may be treated with catheterization and balloon dilatation instead of surgery.

== See also ==
- Atherosclerosis
- Peripheral artery disease
- Stenosis
- Systemic circulation
- Thrombosis
