= Cavoatrial junction =

Place where a major vein joins the heart

The CAJ is the joint between the superior vena cava and the atrium.

The cavoatrial junction (CAJ) is the point at which the superior vena cava meets and melds into the superior wall of the cardiac right atrium. Both the superior and inferior vena cavae enter the right atrium, but only the superior entry is called the cavoatrial junction. This junction marks the inferior end of the superior vena cava, the continuation below that point being considered part of the heart.

For purposes of radiographic visualization, the most reliable indicator of junction location is to find the carina, then observe the vertebrae it overlies. The junction will lie two vertebral body units (VBUs) below the carina, counting the single intervertebral disc between them, but not the disc below them. It has been demonstrated that the more ordinary method of looking for the "bulge" in the cardiac outline is unreliable, since cardiac or other thoracic pathology can shift the apparent position of that landmark.

Hospitalized patients may need to receive solutions and medications that, if given through an ordinary intravenous therapy catheter, would severely damage both blood cells and the vascular system. In these cases, it is common to insert a central venous catheter. All such catheters placed for the purpose of venous access and being inserted in the upper body will ideally have the tip placed within the superior vena cava at or just above the cavoatrial junction. Passing the line through the junction and into the atrium is avoided by some practitioners, as they fear the result may be cardiac arrhythmias and even cardiac tamponade, a potentially fatal outcome. However, other practitioners prefer the proximal RA and state that there is no evidence of harm. Modern catheter tip verification systems often rely on ECG readouts which correlate with tip position. A chest xray may still be obtained to confirm or when an ECG is contraindicated.
