= Belding Hibbard Scribner =

20th-century American physician and pioneer of kidney dialysis

- Born: January 18, 1921; Chicago, Illinois, U.S.
- Died: June 19, 2003 (aged 82); Seattle, Washington, U.S.
- Education: Stanford University (1945)
- Known for: Scribner shunt

Belding Hibbard Scribner (January 18, 1921 – June 19, 2003) was an American physician and a pioneer in kidney dialysis.

== Biography ==
Scribner received his medical degree from Stanford University in 1945. After completing his postgraduate studies at the Mayo Clinic in Rochester, Minnesota, he joined the faculty of the School of Medicine at the University of Washington in 1951. Scribner was married to Ethel Hackett Scribner, and had four children from a previous marriage: Peter, Robert, Thomas and Elizabeth.

In 1960, he, Wayne Quinton, and David Dillard invented a breakthrough device, the Scribner shunt. The device subsequently saved the lives of numerous people with end-stage kidney disease around the globe. The first patient treated was Clyde Shields; due to treatment with the new shunt technique, he survived his chronic kidney failure for more than eleven years, dying in 1971.

Scribner's invention created a new problem for clinical practice and a moral dilemma for physicians: Who will be treated if possible treatment is limited? The ethical issues raised by this dilemma are known as the Seattle experience. In 1964, Scribner's presidential address to the American Society for Artificial Internal Organs discussed the problems of patient selection, termination of treatment, patient suicide, death with dignity, and selection for transplantation. This experience with selecting who would receive dialysis is often recognized as the beginning of bioethics.

To provide dialysis on a routine basis outside a research setting, Dr. Scribner turned to the King County Medical Society for sponsorship of a community-supported outpatient dialysis center. James Haviland, then president of the Society, worked to bring Scribner's vision to fruition. As a result, the Seattle Artificial Kidney Center was established in January 1962. Eventually renamed Northwest Kidney Centers, it was the world's first outpatient dialysis treatment center. Outpatient care has been the standard dialysis care delivery model worldwide since Scribner helped establish the Northwest Kidney Centers.

In 2002, Scribner received the Albert Lasker Award for Clinical Medical Research in 2002, together with Willem J. Kolff.

Scribner used a red canoe to commute from his houseboat to the hospital every day. He published many scientific papers and books up until his death on June 19, 2003, when a kayaker found his body floating near his houseboat; it was conjectured that he had lost his balance and drowned.
