= James W. Haviland =

- birth_date = July 18, 1911
- Born: Glens Falls, New York
- Died: November 14, 2007 (aged 96); Bremerton, Washington

James W. Haviland (July 18, 1911 – November 14, 2007) was an American medical doctor and specialist in Internal Medicine co-founder of the University of Washington School of Medicine and co-founder of the Northwest Kidney Centers.

Haviland graduated from Johns Hopkins University in 1936. Haviland married twice, to Marion Bertram (d. 1993); Mary Katherine (Burden, 1st Marriage; Cook, Maiden Name) in 1997. Haviland had four children.

Northwest Kidney Centers James Haviland Kidney Center, Seattle, WA

He died at his home in Bremerton, Washington, on November 14, 2007, of natural causes.
