= Home hemodialysis =

- NxStage System One cycler, being used for hemodialysis with bags of dialysate
- Specialty: Nephrology

Home hemodialysis (HHD) is the provision of hemodialysis to purify the blood of a person whose kidneys are not working normally, in their own home. One advantage to doing dialysis at home is that it can be done more frequently and slowly, which reduces the "washed out" feeling and other symptoms caused by rapid ultrafiltration, and it can often be done at night, while the person is sleeping.

People on home hemodialysis are followed by a nephrologist who writes the dialysis prescription and they rely on the support of a dialysis unit for back-up treatments and case management. Studies show that HHD improves patients' sense of well-being; the more they know about and control their own treatment the better they are likely to do on dialysis.

HHD was introduced in the 1960s as a way to conserve scarce healthcare resources.

== Schedules ==
There are three basic schedules of HHD and these are differentiated by the length and frequency of dialysis and the time of day the dialysis is carried out. They are as follows:

- Conventional HHD – done three times a week for three to five hours. It is like in-centre hemodialysis (IHD), but done at home. Some patients utilize a modified conventional "EOD" (Every Other Day) strategy in which treatments are performed an average of 3.5 times a week. It is generally accepted that the "3 day gap" that occurs once a week in conventional HHD on the normal 3x/week schedule increases risk to the patient.
- Short daily home hemodialysis (SDHHD) – done five to seven times a week, for two to four hours per session.
- Nocturnal home hemodialysis (NHHD) – done three to seven times per week at night during sleep, for six to ten hours.

Thus an NHHD schedule results in a larger dose of hemodialysis per week, as do some SDHHD. More total time dialyzing, shorter periods between treatments and the fact that fluid removal speeds can be lower (thus reducing the symptoms resulting from rapid ultrafiltration), accounts for the advantages of these schedules over conventional ones.

A frequent NHHD schedule has been shown to have better clinical outcomes than a conventional schedule and evidence is mounting that clinical outcomes are improved with each increase in treatment frequency.

=== Differences between home hemodialysis schedules ===
- When compared with the other schedules, nocturnal dialysis results in reduced strain on the heart during dialysis. The ultrafiltration rate (UFR) in nocturnal dialysis is lower than in CHD (and SDHHD)
- Frequent nocturnal hemodialysis can improve left ventricular mass measures, reduce the need for blood pressure medications, improve some measures of mineral metabolism, and improve selected measures of quality of life.
- When compared with other schedules, nocturnal dialysis results in higher clearance of large and medium-sized molecules (that are diffusion-limited).
- Nocturnal dialysis and SDHHD treatment regimens provide a higher dialysis dose; they have a higher a std Kt/V and HDP than IHD treatment regimens.
- Short dialysis (at home) five times a week is thought to reduce renal osteodystrophy.
- SDHHD and nocturnal dialysis avoid large fluid shifts typical in hemodialysis performed in a healthcare setting after dialysis sessions. These fluid shifts can cause nausea, cramping, and 'wash-out'.

== Advantages of nocturnal home hemodialysis ==
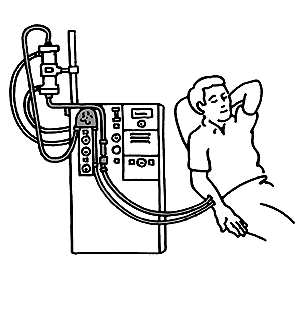
Hemodialysis while sleeping

- Better blood pressure management—less need for blood pressure medications.
- Avoidance of intradialytic hypotension (i.e. low blood pressure during dialysis), something relatively common in IHD.
- More energy and less 'wash-out' after treatment.
- Decreased prevalence of sleep apnea or improvement in severe cases of sleep apnea – sleep better.
- Less expensive overall for the health system due to lower rates of hospitalization and savings on nursing.
- Less dietary restrictions—e.g., phosphate binders, kidney failure food restrictions.
- More control over the dialysis treatment schedule and greater life satisfaction.
- Live longer, according to a case-cohort study.
- Cardiovascular disease in ESRD patients is the leading cause of mortality. Nocturnal hemodialysis is thought to improve ejection fraction (an important measure of cardiac function) and lead to a regression in left ventricular hypertrophy. A benefit of 6x/week nocturnal hemodialysis on left ventricular hypertrophy was demonstrated in a randomized controlled trial.

== Disadvantages of nocturnal home hemodialysis ==
- Training is usually done during business hours, as often as five times a week. Training can take from 2 to 8 weeks at which time one is dialyzed incenter, often in a separate home hemodialysis training unit.
- Introducing dialysis into the home will impact everyone in the home, for good and bad.
- Space is needed for the dialysis machine and supplies.
- One may face increased utility costs. (Some utilities have accommodations available)
- Supply management may require time during business hours e.g. to receive deliveries, to drop off blood draws.
- May require trip to center once a month for iron and case management.
- If nocturnal dialysis is chosen some night's sleep can be disrupted due to machine alarms. Experience from Lynchburg suggests it happens once every 10 days for people using a fistula and 1-2 times per night if using a catheter.

== Barriers to home hemodialysis ==
=== Knowledge barriers ===
- Lack of awareness amongst patients – most patients with kidney disease in the USA are not informed of home hemodialysis as a treatment option for end-stage renal disease. One US study found that 36% of patients did not have contact with a nephrologist until less than 4 months prior to their first dialysis session and that only 12% of patients were offered home hemodialysis as a treatment option.
- Lack of awareness for nephrologists. The lack of familiarity with home hemodialysis makes them less likely to offer it to suitable patients.

=== Patient factors: in general ===
- Disability or frailty.
- Patient fear of needles/self-cannulation.
- Patient belief that they will get better care in hospital.
- Lack of significant other to assist with HHD. Some clinics require a significant other and require that the significant other be trained.
- Desire to compartmentalize disease – avoid creating a "sick home"; wish to think of illness only at treatment center.
- Have suitable space and facilities or an area that could be adapted within their home environment
- Have the ability and motivation to learn to carry out the process.
- Commitment to maintain treatment.
- Are stable on dialysis (see next section for further details on adherence issues) and free of complications and significant concomitant disease that would render home dialysis unsuitable or unsafe.

=== Patient factors: barriers to home dialysis from non-adherence to regimes ===
- Fluid adherence is influenced by a heightened sense of thirst.
- Possible cognitive executive functioning issues associated with conditions of uremia due to end-stage kidney disease. This may affect memory, ability to plan effectively, and keeping to schedules.
- High levels of depression and anxiety are also typically associated with end-state kidney disease and the resulting life style changes, also contributing to reduced cognitive and behavioral functioning, and negative illness schemas. These factors may influence both motivation and capacity for adherence/compliance to regimes.

=== Patient factors: addressing dialysis non-adherence ===
- Cognitive behavioural therapy has been shown to be effective with dialysis patients to address levels of depression, specific phobias/fears, and to decrease levels of anxiety.
- Use of psychoeducation to assist patient and carers understanding and insights into non-adherence issues.

=== Health care funding models ===
- Incenter dialysis and home hemodialysis are reimbursed to exactly the same amounts in the United States under the ESRD program. From CMS's point of view any form of dialysis is still more expensive than renal transplantation if looked at over a three-year period. A good kidney transplant (one that lasts five years) remains the cheapest long term renal replacement therapy.
- In many jurisdictions doctors are not compensated to facilitate/encourage home dialysis; in the USA most kidney doctors are not paid for discussing different treatment options with their patients. In fact compared to the Medicare reimbursement if the doctor rounds incenter weekly, Medicare reimbursement to follow someone at home is less per month.
- In the US to recoup the unreimbursed cost of training providers need people with Medicare as their primary insurer to dialyze at home for approximately one year. HHD requires a large initial capital expenditure, as each HHD patient requires their own dialysis machine and lengthy (expensive) training. Significant savings and benefits (for the society) from HHD are realized in the long term because of
  1. better health outcomes for patients and lower rates of hospitalization,
  2. higher productivity of ESRD patients (more can hold down steady jobs and contribute to society) and
  3. lower (nursing) labour costs.

Dialysis providers only stand to benefit from (3) (lower nursing costs) as the other costs (1) (poorer health) and (2) (lower productivity), as currently structured, are externalized to society. With the expensive training and hemodialysis equipment required, the return on investment is high only for long-term home hemodialysis patients.

== History of home hemodialysis ==
Home hemodialysis started in the early 1960s. Who started it is in dispute. Groups in Boston, London, Seattle and Hokkaidō all have a claim.

The Hokkaidō group was slightly ahead of the others, with Nosé's publication of his PhD thesis (in 1962), which described treating patients outside of the hospital for acute kidney injury due to drug overdoses. In 1963, he attempted to publish these cases in the ASAIO Journal but was unsuccessful, which was later described in the ASAIO Journal when people were invited to write about unconventional/crazy rejected papers. That these treatments took place in people's homes is hotly disputed by Shaldon and he has accused Nosé of a faulty memory and not being completely honest, as allegedly revealed by some shared Polish Vodka, many years earlier.

The Seattle group (originally the Seattle Artificial Kidney Center, later the Northwest Kidney Centers) started their home program in July 1964. It was inspired by the fifteen-year-old daughter of a collaborator's friend, who went into kidney failure due to lupus erythematosus, and had been denied access to dialysis by their patient selection committee. Dialysis treatment at home was the only alternative and managed to extend her life another four years. Dr. Chris Blagg has stated that the first training predated the establishment of the home program: the "first home patient wasn't part of our program at all, he was president of a big Indian corporation, lived in Madras, and he came to Seattle just before I came in '63. He came in early '63, again, with his doctor and his wife and Dr. Scribner trained them to do dialysis at home and they went home to Madras."

In September 1964 the London group (led by Shaldon) started dialysis treatment at home. In the late 1960s, Shaldon introduced HHD in Germany.

Home hemodialysis machines have changed considerably since the inception of the practice. Nosé's machine consisted of a coil (to transport the blood) placed in a household (electric) washing machine filled with dialysate. It did not have a pump and blood transport through the coil was dependent on the patient's heart. The dialysate was circulated by turning on the washing machine (which mixed the dialysate and resulted in some convection) and Nosé's experiments show that this indeed improved the clearance of toxins.

In the USA there has been a large decline in home hemodialysis over the past 30 years. In the early 1970s, approximately 40% of patients used it. Today, it is used by approximately 0.4%. In other countries NHHD use is much higher. In Australia approximately 11% of ESRD patients use NHHD.

The large decline in HHD seen in the 1970s and early 1980s is due to several factors. It coincides with the introduction and arise of continuous ambulatory peritoneal dialysis (CAPD) in the late 1970s, an increase in the age and the number of comorbidities (degree of "sickness") in the ESRD population, and, in some countries such USA, changes in how dialysis care is funded (which lead to more hospital-based hemodialysis).

Home night-time (nocturnal) hemodialysis was first introduced by Baillod et al. in the UK and grew popular in some centers, such as the Northwest Kidney Centers, but then declined in the 1970s (coinciding with the decline in HHD). Since the early 1990s, NHHD has become more popular again. Uldall and Pierratos started a program in Toronto, which advocated long night-time treatments (and coined the term 'nocturnal home hemodialysis') and Agar in Geelong converted his HHD patients to NHHD.

== Equipment ==
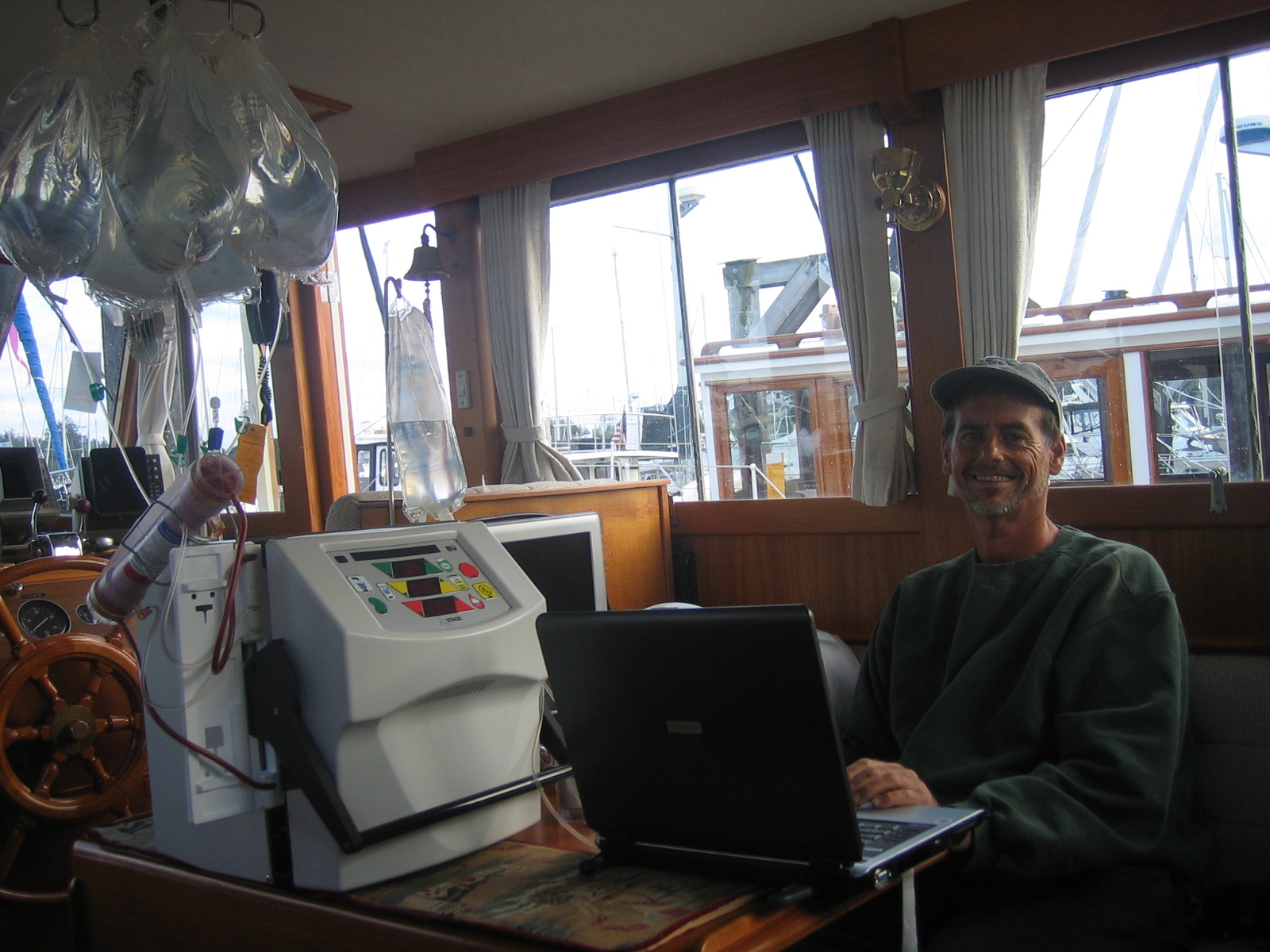
NxStage System One cycler, being used for hemodialysis with bags of dialysate

Currently, three hemodialysis machines are used for home hemodialysis in the United States. They are made by B. Braun Melsungen, Fresenius and NxStage, a division of Fresenius Medical Care. The systems take different approaches to the process of dialysis. The B Braun is a standard hemodialysis machine and is used in-center and at home. The Fresenius "Baby K" home machine is close to a standard hemodialysis machine, but somewhat more user friendly and smaller. Both the B Braun and the Fresenius Baby K require a separate reverse osmosis water treatment system which allow dialysate flow rates generally from 300 to 800 ml/minute.

The NxStage System One cycler uses far less dialysate per treatment with a maximum dialysate flow rate of 200 ml/minute but generally runs at rates less than 150 ml/minute. The NxStage System One can be used with bags of ultrapure dialysate – from 15 to 60 liters per treatment (see photo showing treatment in process). This allows the System One to be transportable; as of 2008 the company supports travel within the continental US and will assist travel to Alaska and Hawaii (travel to AK & HI will result in the patient having additional out of pocket costs). Generally, the supplies including the dialysate are delivered as they are scheduled to be used, either bimonthly or monthly but the amount of supplies can become a concern. The System One can also use a separate dialysate production device manufactured by NxStage – the PureFlow. The PureFlow uses a deionization process to create a 60, 50 or 40 liter batch of dialysate depending on the SAK (bag of dialysate concentrate) specified by the MD. A batch has a 96-hour shelf life and is usually used for two or three treatments, although some patients are using the entire 60, 50 or 40 liter batch for a single extended treatment.

== Frequency hemodialysis ==
Patients on frequent daytime hemodialysis have done well on short sessions (1.5 hours) given 6 times per week, although this would total 9 hours per week, and is fewer hours per week than most patients being dialyzed 3x/week. When changing from a 3x/week to a 6x/week schedule, if total weekly time is left the same (each session length cut in half), patients typically will still remove a little bit more waste products initially than with conventional schedules, since the blood levels of toxins during the initial hour of dialysis are higher than in subsequent hours. Most patients treating themselves "daily" (6x/week) with daytime hemodialysis use session lengths of 2–3 hours. Longer session lengths give more benefit in terms of fluid and especially, phosphate removal. However, unless sessions are prolonged beyond 3–4 hours, almost all 6x/week patients will still require phosphate binders. Fluid and phosphate removal with "daily" dialysis are made more difficult because patients often feel better and increase protein (and thus also, phosphate) as well as fluid intake.

When nocturnal dialysis is given 3 or 3.5 times (every other night) per week, the total weekly duration of dialysis is markedly prolonged, since each session typically lasts 6–8 hours, compared to 3–4 hours for conventional dialysis. This gives benefits in terms of fluid removal and phosphate removal, although about 1/2 to 2/3 of patients receiving this kind of treatment will still require phosphate binders. When such long nocturnal sessions are given 6x/week, in almost all patients phosphate binders can be stopped, and in a substantial number, phosphate needs to be added to the dialysate to prevent phosphate depletion. Because of the long weekly dialysis time, fluid removal is very well controlled, as the rate of ultrafiltration is quite low.

Whereas adequacy of conventional dialysis is measured by urea reduction ratio URR or Kt/V, the question of adequacy of more frequent dialysis is based on opinion only and not on controlled trials. The KDOQI 2006 adequacy group, in their Clinical Practice Recommendations, suggested using the Standardized Kt/V as a minimum standard of adequacy for dialysis schedules other than 3x/week. A minimum standardized Kt/V value of 2.0 per week was suggested.

== See also ==
- Hemodialysis
- Peritoneal dialysis
- Chronic kidney failure
- Nephrology
