= Standardized Kt/V =

Standardized Kt/V, also std Kt/V, is a way of measuring (renal) dialysis adequacy. It was developed by Frank Gotch and is used in the United States to measure dialysis. Despite the name, it is quite different from Kt/V. In theory, both peritoneal dialysis and hemodialysis can be quantified with std Kt/V.

== Derivation ==
Standardized Kt/V is motivated by the steady state solution of the mass transfer equation often used to approximate kidney function (equation 1), which is also used to define clearance.

$$V \frac{dC}{dt} = -K \cdot C + \dot{m} \qquad(1)$$

where

- $\dot{m}$ is the mass generation rate of the substance - assumed to be a constant, i.e. not a function of time (equal to zero for foreign substances/drugs) [mmol/min] or [mol/s]
- t is dialysis time [min] or [s]
- V is the volume of distribution (total body water) [L] or [m^{3}]
- K is the clearance [mL/min] or [m^{3}/s]
- C is the concentration [mmol/L] or [mol/m^{3}] (in the United States often [mg/mL])

From the above definitions it follows that $\frac{dC}{dt}$ is the first derivative of concentration with respect to time, i.e. the change in concentration with time.

Derivation equation 1 is described in the article clearance (medicine).

The solution of the above differential equation (equation 1) is

$$C = \frac{\dot{m}}{K} + \left(C_{o}-\frac{\dot{m}}{K}\right) e^{-\frac{K \cdot t}{V}} \qquad(2)$$

where

- C_{o} is the concentration at the beginning of dialysis [mmol/L] or [mol/m^{3}]
- e is the base of the natural logarithm

The steady state solution is

$$C_{\infty} = \frac {\dot{m}}{K} \qquad(3a)$$

This can be written as

$$K = \frac {\dot{m}}{C_{\infty}} \qquad(3b)$$

Equation 3b is the equation that defines clearance. It is the motivation for K' (the equivalent clearance):

$${K'}  = \frac {\dot{m}}{C_o} \qquad(4)$$

where

- K' is the equivalent clearance [mL/min] or [m^{3}/s]
- $\dot{m}$ is the mass generation rate of the substance - assumed to be a constant, i.e. not a function of time [mmol/min] or [mol/s]
- C_{o} is the concentration at the beginning of dialysis [mmol/L] or [mol/m^{3}]

Equation 4 is normalized by the volume of distribution to form equation 5:

$$\frac {K'}{V}  = \frac {\dot{m}}{C_o \cdot V} \qquad(5)$$

Equation 5 is multiplied by an arbitrary constant t to form equation 6:

$$t \cdot \frac {K'}{V}  = t \cdot \frac {\dot{m}}{C_o \cdot V} \qquad(6)$$

where t is defined as 7×24×60×60 seconds, the number of seconds in a week.

Equation 6 is then defined as standardized Kt/V (std Kt/V):

$\mbox{std} \frac{K \cdot t}{V} \ \stackrel{\mathrm{def}}{=}\ \mbox{const} \cdot \frac {\dot{m}}{C_o \cdot V} \qquad(7)$

== Interpretation of std Kt/V ==
Standardized Kt/V can be interpreted as a concentration normalized by the mass generation per unit volume of body water.

Equation 7 can be written in the following way:

$$\mbox{std} \frac{K \cdot t}{V} \ \stackrel{\mathrm{def}}{=}\mbox{ const} \cdot \frac {\dot{m}}{V} \frac{1}{C_o} \qquad(8)$$

If one takes the inverse of Equation 8 it can be observed that the inverse of std Kt/V is proportional to the concentration of urea (in the body) divided by the production of urea per time per unit volume of body water.

$$\left[ std \frac{K \cdot t}{V} \right]^{-1} \propto \frac{C_o}{\dot{m}/V} \qquad(9)$$

== Comparison to Kt/V ==
Kt/V and standardized Kt/V are not the same. Kt/V assumes a process described by $V \frac{dC}{dt} = -K \cdot C$ (no mass generation) while std Kt/V considers a $\dot{m}$ term. After solving both differential equations, Kt/V appears as a function of the ratio of the pre- and post-dialysis urea concentrations, while std Kt/V as one that only depends on C_{0} (compare equation 8 and equation 10).

Kt/V is defined as (see article on Kt/V for derivation):

$\frac{K \cdot t}{V} = \ln \frac{C_o}{C} \qquad(10)$

Since Kt/V and std Kt/V model different processes, they cannot be compared to each other clinically.

=== Advantages of std Kt/V ===
- Can be used to compare any dialysis schedule (i.e. nocturnal home hemodialysis vs. daily hemodialysis vs. conventional hemodialysis)
- Applicable to peritoneal dialysis.
- Can be applied to patients with residual renal function; it is possible to demonstrate that C_{o} is a function of the residual kidney function and the "cleaning" provided by dialysis.
- The model can be applied to substances other than urea, if the clearance, K, and generation rate of the substance, $\dot{m}$, are known.

=== Criticism/disadvantages of std Kt/V ===
- It is complex and tedious to calculate, although web-based calculators are available to do this fairly easily.
- Many nephrologists have difficulty understanding it.
- Urea is not associated with toxicity. Standardized Kt/V only models the clearance of urea and thus implicitly assumes the clearance of urea is comparable to more relevant toxins. It ignores molecules that (relative to urea) have diffusion-limited transport - so called middle molecules.
- When used on non-urea solutes, it ignores the mass transfer between body compartments and across the plasma membrane (i.e. intracellular to extracellular transport), which has been shown to be important for the clearance of molecules such as phosphate.
- The Standardized Kt/V is based on body water volume (V). The Glomerular filtration rate, an estimate of normal kidney function, is usually normalized to body surface area (S). The S/V ratio differs markedly between small vs. large people and between men and women. A man and a woman of the same S will have similar levels of GFR, but their values for V may differ by 15-20%. Because standardized Kt/V incorporates residual renal function into the calculations, it makes the assumption that kidney function should scale by V. This may disadvantage women and smaller patients of either sex, in whom V is decreased to a greater extent than S.

== Calculating stdKt/V ==
For stdKt/V to be useful, it needs to be calculatable from more basic measurements such as treatment Kt/V and number of sessions per week. The various ways of computing standardized Kt/V by Gotch, Leypoldt, and the FHN trial network are all a bit different, as assumptions differ on equal spacing of treatments, use of a fixed or variable volume model, and whether or not urea rebound is taken into effect.

The KDOQI 2015 Update of their Hemodialysis Adequacy includes two formulas, the Leypoldt (fixed volume model without K_{r}) and the Daugirdas (variable volume model with K_{ru}).

=== Leypoldt ===
The simplified Leypoldt model assumes no residual kidney function K_{ru}.

$$\begin{aligned}
\texttt{e.Kt/V} &= \text{sp.Kt/V} \cdot \left(\frac{t}{t+30}\right) \\
\texttt{std.Kt/V}_{\text{Ley}} &= 10080 \cdot (1 - e^{-\texttt{e.Kt/V}}) / t / \left(\frac {1 - e^{-\texttt{e.Kt/V}}}{\texttt{e.Kt/V}} + \frac{10080}{N \cdot t} - 1\right)
\end{aligned}$$

where

- t is the session duration in minutes (and 10080 the number of minutes in a week),;
- N is the number of sessions per week;
- sp.Kt/V is the single-pool Kt/V, computed as described in Kt/V section using a simplified equation or ideally, using urea modeling;
- e.Kt/V is the urea-equilibrated Kt/V, computed from t and sp.Kt/V using a modification of the Tattersall equation here.

This may be compared to the version from the 2006 KDOQI guidelines (difference in red sans-serif), sometimes called Leypoldt-Depner:

$$\texttt{std.Kt/V}_\text{LeyDep} = 10080 \cdot (1 - e^{-\texttt{e.Kt/V}}) / t / \left(\frac {1 - e^{-\texttt{e.Kt/V}}}{\color{Red} {\textsf{sp.Kt/V}}} + \frac{10080}{N \cdot t} - 1\right)$$

=== Daugirdas ===
The Daugirdas correction takes into account some residual kidney function and the ultrafiltration rate.

$$\texttt{std.Kt/V}_{\text{Dau}} = \frac{\texttt{std.Kt/V}_{\text{Ley}}}{1-\frac{0.74 U_f}{F \cdot V}} + \frac{10080 K_{ru}}{V}$$

where

- std.Kt/V_{Ley} is the std kt/V estimate from the Leypoldt model;
- U_{f} is the weekly ultrafiltration volume in mL;
- V is the volume of distribution for urea in mL;
- K_{ru} is the residual native kidney function of urea in mL/min.

Although the true std Kt/v model takes into account K_{ru} and U_{f}, the contribution of K_{ru} is underestimated when using modelled values of urea generation rate ṁ (also called G), e.Kt/V, and average predialysis BUN C̅_{0̅} (also called avC_{pre}). The left half of the correction works fixes the Leypoldt estimate by using modelled values of G and V while the right half adds the effect of K_{ru}.

When K_{ru} = 0 (so when only considering the left part), std.Kt/V_{Dau} is about 7% higher on average than std.Kt/V_{Ley}.

=== Other methods ===
The regular "rate equation" also can be used to determine equilibrated Kt/V from the spKt/V, as long as session length is 120 min or longer.

== Plot showing std Kt/V depending on regular Kt/V for different treatment regimens ==
Plot relating standardized Kt/V, Kt/V and treatment frequency per week.

One can create a plot to relate the three grouping (standardized Kt/V, Kt/V, treatment frequency per week), sufficient to define a dialysis schedule. The equations are strongly dependent on session length; the numbers will change substantially between two sessions given at the same schedule, but with different session lengths.

For the present plot, a session length of 0.4 Kt/V units per hour was assumed, with a minimum dialysis session length of 2.0 hours.
