= Dialysis adequacy =

Measurement of renal dialysis

- Purpose: the measurement of renal dialysis

In nephrology, dialysis adequacy is the measurement of renal dialysis for the purpose of determining dialysis treatment regime and to better understand the pathophysiology of renal dialysis. It is an area of considerable controversy in nephrology.

In the US, the dominant way of measuring dialysis adequacy in Kt/V and based on the clearance of urea, though the relevance of this measurement is disputed.

== Urea ==
=== Comparing normal to ERSD ===
The normal clearance of urea is approximately 100 ml/min. A patient getting a conventional hemodialysis treatment, without remaining residual function, has a urea clearance of 10-15 ml/min.
