= Hemodialysis product =

Hemodialysis product (HDP) - is a number used to quantify hemodialysis and peritoneal dialysis treatment adequacy.

It was proposed by Scribner and Oreopoulous because of their perceived inadequacy of the Kt/V measure of dialysis adequacy.

The HDP is defined by the following empirical formula:

HDP = t * f ^{2}

Where:

- HDP - hemodialysis product
- t - dialysis time (hours/dialysis session)
- f - dialysis frequency (dialysis sessions/week)

The formula, like all empirical formulae, has no theoretical basis. The HDP has not seen widespread use. An Egyptian study published in 2011 found that HDP is "a valid test with high sensitivity and specificity for assessment of adequacy of hemodialysis in comparison to KT/V and URR." The formula has been tested by me using nxstage system one 4.78 x 7 x 7 = 234 During dialysis I performed potassium blood electrolyte test. Using 2K dialysate potassium level went to normal. Here is the reason: lactate 45 instead of bicarbonate. This is the theoretical basis, Scribner has no machine that uses lactate but peritoneal is using lactate. Also with HDP 234 my BP is normal without medications. My hemoglobin is 14.7 no EPO.
