= Augmented renal clearance =

Change in kidney function during illness

In pharmacology, augmented renal clearance (ARC) is a phenomenon where certain critically ill patients may display increased clearance of a medication through the kidneys. In many cases, it is observed as a measured creatinine clearance above that which is expected given the patient's age, sex, and other factors. The phenomenon is most commonly observed in patients with neurologic damage, sepsis, major trauma, or burns.

Augmented renal clearance can be caused by increased fluid administration, certain medications, and critical illnesses. It can lead to failure of treatment in people due to a decrease in drug concentrations, increase in clearance, or shorter half life. Many medications require adjustment to account for the changed clearance in people with ARC, notably some antibiotics.

== History ==
Normal kidney function measured by creatinine clearance varies in different populations based on age, gender, race, fluid balance, and other factors, but also can be affected by diseases themselves. This makes it challenging to assign an objective number or scale to kidney function. For this reason, kidney function (and thus medication elimination) has been approximated by measuring creatinine clearance, or calculating an estimated glomerular filtration rate (eGFR), since 1976. Beginning in the late 1970s, an increase in the creatinine clearance had been observed in burn patients. This led to the realization that some burn patients required higher than expected doses of aminoglycosides to obtain the same serum concentration of drug.

== Diagnosis ==
The primary sign of augmented renal clearance is an increase in the creatinine clearance well above that which would be considered normal. Commonly, ARC is defined as a creatinine clearance of greater than 130 mL/min, but the effects of increased clearance on therapy are not directly correlated to a specific number. For this reason, lower cutoffs such as 120 mL/min are used by some, as well as higher cutoffs in young people who typically have higher kidney function to begin with. Another cutoff used is 10% above the upper limit of normal for a certain population.

In patients who do not have their creatinine clearance or eGFR measured or calculated frequently, augmented renal clearance may be first seen by the failure of certain medications to produce the expected effect in a patient. As an example, an antibiotic that is being administered at recommended doses in accordance with antibiotic sensitivity testing may not be inducing clinical improvement in a person. This may also be recognized if calculated dosages based on pharmacokinetic monitoring are higher than expected for a patient.

== Causes ==
Shannon et al. observed in 1932 that dogs had an increased renal function after high protein meals – which they termed "renal function reserve". Activation of this "reserve" or extra-renal function has been suggested as a potential mechanism for ARC in severe illness.

The administration of medications which increase blood flow to the kidneys has also been considered a potential cause of ARC, including administration of fluids. Some medications which have been thought to cause increased renal clearance include norepinephrine and other vasopressors. While medications may increase renal clearance, many patients with severe illness have higher clearance prior to the initiation of these medications. Augmented renal clearance also may occur in people who have some types of cancers, such as hematologic cancers. In these people, the efficacy of antibiotic treatment may be decreased if the increased clearance is not accounted for.

== Risk factors and screening ==
Patients with critical illnesses can be screened for risk of ARC affecting therapy in a number of ways. Scoring methods may use factors such as the following to predict ARC in critically ill patients:

- Age
- Serum creatinine
- Leukemia
- Major trauma
- APACHE III
- SOFA score

== Management ==
Augmented renal clearance may result in failure of treatment due to the increased elimination of drugs. This can be prevented by increasing the dosage of the medication, or by increasing the frequency the medication is administered to account for increased elimination. ARC influences the recommended dosages for antibiotics including aminoglycosides, beta-lactams, fluoroquinolones, and vancomycin in critical care. In any case, the occurrence of ARC is managed through pharmacokinetic monitoring and adjusting medication dosages, frequencies, or timing to ensure adequate response.

The occurrence of ARC can also impact medications that are unrelated to an acute illness, such as levetiracetam for seizures. People taking a stable dose of levetiracetam at home may require an increased dose when critically ill in a hospital to maintain efficacy.

== Epidemiology ==
Occurrence of ARC by disease
Disease state	ARC (CrCl >130 mL/min)
Severe burn	65%
Sepsis	39.5–56%
Subarachnoid hemorrhage	100%
Trauma	85.7%
Traumatic brain injury	85%

Augmented renal clearance can occur in many critical care instances, but is common when patients are administered large quantities of fluid replacement, as is common in an intensive care unit. It is considered a normal part of the body's response to a severe infection or other traumatic event. Changes in renal function due to trauma or infection may be in part due to changes in hormone release as part of the body's immune and healing responses.
