= Nils Alwall =

Swedish professor and inventor

- Born: October 7, 1904; Kiaby, Sweden
- Died: February 2, 1986 (aged 81); Lund, Sweden
- Occupation(s): Professor, inventor

Nils Alwall (October 7, 1904 – February 2, 1986) was a Swedish professor at Lund University, Sweden. He was a pioneer in hemodialysis and the inventor of one of the first practical dialysis machines. Alwall pioneered the technique of ultrafiltration and introduced the principle of hemofiltration. Alwall is referred to as the "father of extracorporeal blood treatment."

== Artificial kidney ==
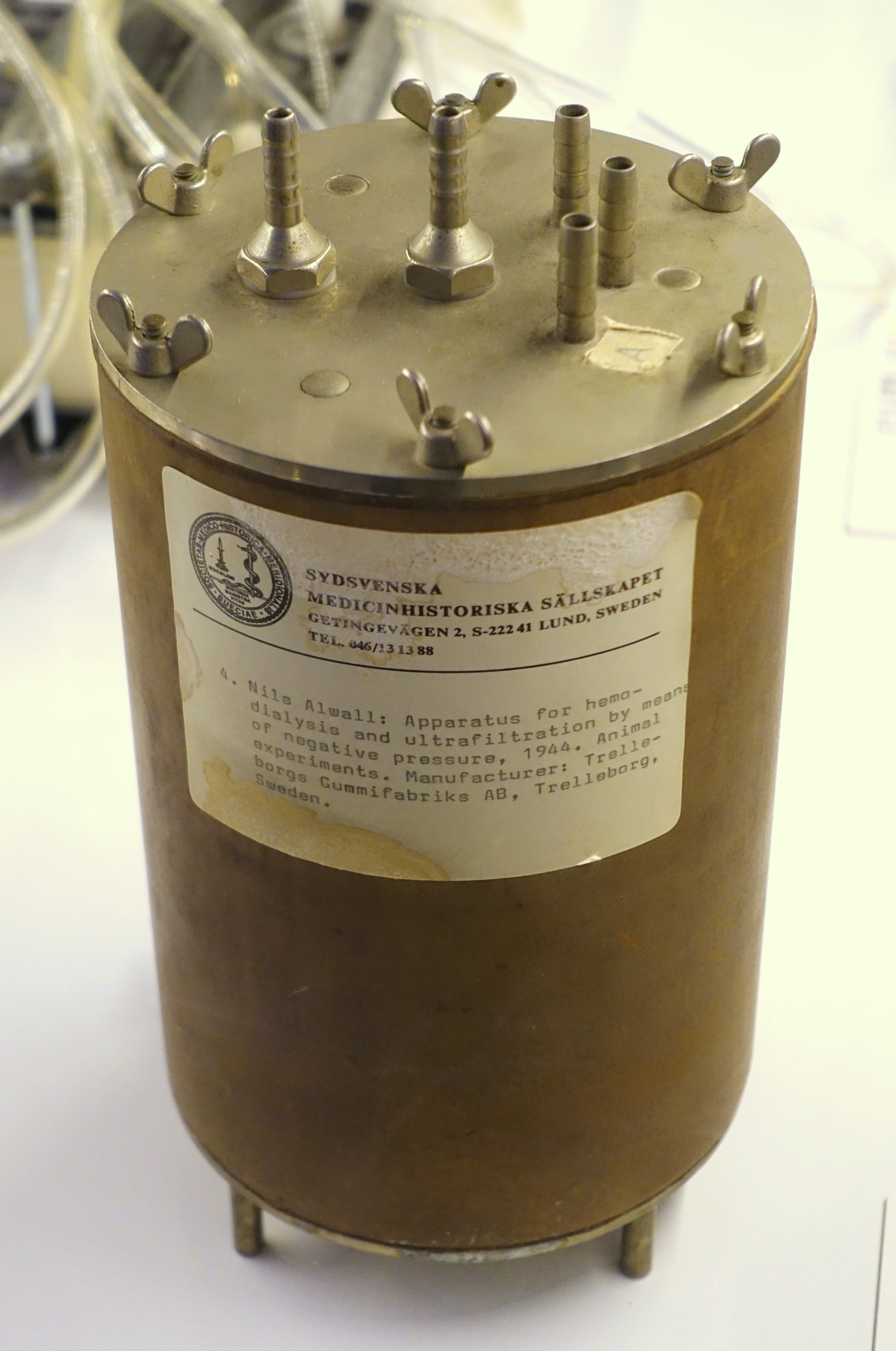
Dialysis machine for rabbits, Nils Alwall, 1944

Willem Johan Kolff constructed the first artificial kidney; however, it was not very useful clinically because it did not allow for removal of excess fluid. Alwall modified a similar construction to the Kolff kidney by enclosing it inside a stainless steel canister. This allowed the removal of fluids, by applying a negative pressure to the outside canister, thus making it the first truly practical device for hemodialysis. On September 3, 1946, Alwall treated his first patient in acute kidney injury, who responded well to the treatment but died of pneumonia a short while after.

Alwall also was arguably the inventor of the arteriovenous shunt for dialysis. He reported this first in 1948, where he used such an arteriovenous shunt in rabbits. Subsequently, he used such shunts, made of glass, as well as his canister-enclosed dialyzer, to treat 1,500 people in kidney failure between 1946 and 1960, as reported to the First International Congress of Nephrology held in Evian in September 1960.

As of 2007, two patients for which kidney replacement therapy was initiated by Alwall in 1968 and 1971, respectively, have survived for over 35 years on hemodialysis. These patients represent two of the longest known survivors on hemodialysis worldwide.

== Later life ==
Alwall was appointed to the newly created Chair of Nephrology at Lund University in 1957. Subsequently, he collaborated with Swedish businessman Holger Crafoord to found one of the key companies that would manufacture dialysis equipment for several decades, Gambro, Inc.

== Nils Alwall Prize ==
In honor of Alwall's advancements and achievements, the Nils Alwall Prize is awarded every year for "Groundbreaking research in the field of kidney replacement therapy."
