= Mass transfer coefficient =

Rate constant in engineering

In engineering, the mass transfer coefficient is a diffusion rate constant that relates the mass transfer rate, mass transfer area, and concentration change as driving force:

$k_c = \frac{\dot{n}_A}{A \Delta c_A}$

Where:

- $k_c$ is the mass transfer coefficient [mol/(s·m^{2})/(mol/m^{3})], or m/s
- $\dot{n}_A$ is the mass transfer rate [mol/s]
- $A$ is the effective mass transfer area [m^{2}]
- $\Delta c_A$ is the driving force concentration difference [mol/m^{3}].

This can be used to quantify the mass transfer between phases, immiscible and partially miscible fluid mixtures (or between a fluid and a porous solid). Quantifying mass transfer allows for design and manufacture of separation process equipment that can meet specified requirements, estimate what will happen in real life situations (chemical spill), etc.

Mass transfer coefficients can be estimated from many different theoretical equations, correlations, and analogies that are functions of material properties, intensive properties and flow regime (laminar or turbulent flow). Selection of the most applicable model is dependent on the materials and the system, or environment, being studied.

== Mass transfer coefficient units ==
- (mol/s)/(m^{2}·mol/m^{3}) = m/s

Note, the units will vary based upon which units the driving force is expressed in. The driving force shown here as '${ \Delta c_A}$' is expressed in units of moles per unit of volume, but in some cases the driving force is represented by other measures of concentration with different units. For example, the driving force may be partial pressures when dealing with mass transfer in a gas phase and thus use units of pressure.

== See also ==
- Mass transfer
- Separation process
- Sieving coefficient
