= Nocturnal dialysis =

Renal dialysis done at night

In medicine, nocturnal dialysis, refers to (renal) dialysis done at night. It usually is a reference to nocturnal hemodialysis, but could also refer to peritoneal dialysis which is typically done at night.

Nocturnal hemodialysis was conceived by the late Dr. Robert Uldall at Wellesley Hospital in Toronto, Ontario, Canada. The first patient trained was in April 1994. Conventional hemodialysis consists of a patient traveling to a clinic three times per week for a four-hour treatment. With nocturnal hemodialysis patients are trained to provide the treatments in their home six or seven nights per week for six to eight hours per treatment. There are some scientific studies which show benefits for patients using nocturnal hemodialysis versus conventional treatments, as well as many benefits that have not been studied yet.

== See also ==
- Home hemodialysis
