= Frank Gotch (physician) =

American physician

Frank A. Gotch
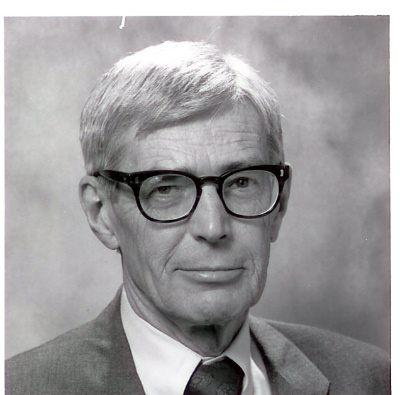
- Born: Frank A. Gotch; August 27, 1926; Humboldt, Iowa
- Died: February 18, 2017 (aged 90); San Francisco, California
- Education: University of California, Berkeley; University of California, San Francisco
- Occupation: Nephrologist
- Years active: 1951 - 2015
- Spouse: Sarah Berrick Gotch
- Children: 2

Frank A. Gotch (August 27, 1926 – February 18, 2017) was an American physician known for his work in renal dialysis adequacy, specifically the development of Kt/V and standardized Kt/V. He was an associate professor of medicine at the University of California, San Francisco.

Gotch was a consultant to the Renal Research Institute in New York and was associate professor of medicine at UCSF. Gotch worked in clinical dialysis and dialysis research, particularly quantification of therapy, for over 30 years. He chaired the NIH Hemodialyzer evaluation Study Group which sets standards for dialyzer performance in 1972 and the National NIH conference on Adequacy of Hemodialysis in 1975. He served on the planning committee and as kinetic consultant to the National Cooperative Dialysis Study and served on the steering committee of the current HEMO study and was co-principal investigator of a cooperative study of randomized peritoneal dialysis prescriptions and clinical outcome. Furthermore, he has over 100 publications and provided consultation in dialysis kinetics and dialysis systems development to industry. His research interests were primarily concerned with modeling dialysis technology.
