= Urea reduction ratio =

Number used to quantify dialysis treatment

The urea reduction ratio (URR) is a dimensionless number used to quantify dialysis treatment adequacy.

== Definition ==
$URR = \frac{U_{pre}-U_{post}}{U_{pre}} \times 100\%$

Where:

- U_{pre} is the pre-dialysis urea level
- U_{post} is the post-dialysis urea level

Whereas the URR is formally defined as the urea reduction "ratio", in practice it is informally multiplied by 100% as shown in the formula above, and expressed as a percent.

== History and overview ==
The URR was first popularized by Lowrie and Lew in 1991 as a method of measuring amount of dialysis that correlated with patient outcome. This method is very useful because of its simplicity. It permits easy monitoring of the amount of dialysis therapy delivered to individual patients, as well as across dialysis units, groups of units, states, regions, or countries, because monthly predialysis and postdialysis urea nitrogen values are routinely measured. It also permits quality control and improvement initiatives and regulatory oversight. The United States Renal Data Systems (USRDS) publishes annual data regarding the URR values being delivered to dialysis patients across the United States. The ESRD networks monitor therapy across groups of states. The European Renal Association (ERA-EDTA) Registry covers most European countries, and DOPPS (Dialysis Outcomes Practice Patterns Study) records and analyzes URR and other data from selected dialysis units located in countries across the world.

== Relation to Kt/V ==
Mathematically, the URR is closely related to Kt/V, and the two quantities can be derived from another with more or less precision, depending on the amount of additional information available about a given dialysis session.

Kt/V is one of the reference methods by which the amount of dialysis given is measured. Kt/V, like the URR, focuses on urea as the target solute, and is based on the assumption that removal of urea is from a single space – urea distribution volume, or $V \,$ similar in capacity to the total body water. The urea distribution volume $V \,$, although traditionally thought of as 60% of body weight, may actually be closer to 50% of the body weight in women and 55% in men with stage V (GFR < 15 ml/min) chronic kidney disease. The clearance of urea during the dialysis session $K \,$ can be expressed in either $\frac {ml}{min}$ or $\frac {L}{hr}$.
Time or $t \,$ is the duration of the dialysis session, measured either in minutes or hours. So $K \cdot t$ is also a volume, either $\frac {ml}{min} \cdot min = ml$, or $\frac {L}{hr} \cdot hr = L$, and represents the volume of blood (in ml or L) cleared of urea during the dialysis session. Because $V \,$ is also a volume, the ratio of $\frac {K \cdot t}{V}$ has dimensions of $\frac{ml}{ml}$ or $\frac{L}{L}$, making it a "dimensionless" ratio.

In a simplified model of urea removal from a fixed volume with no urea generation, $\frac{K \cdot t}{V}$ is related to $URR \,$ by the following relationship:

$\frac{K \cdot t}{V} = -ln (1-URR)$

Actually, this relationship is made a bit more complex by the fact that fluid is removed during dialysis, so the removal space V shrinks, and because a small amount of urea is generated during the dialysis session. Both of these factors make the actual post-dialysis serum urea level higher than expected, and the URR lower than expected, when the extremely simplified equation above, is used.

A more accurate relationship between URR and Kt/V can be derived by single-pool, variable volume urea kinetic modeling. A simplified estimating equation also can be used. This gives results that are quite similar to formal urea modeling as long as dialysis treatments of 2–6 hours in duration are given, and Kt/V is between 0.7 and 2.0.

$\frac{K \cdot t}{V} = -ln ((1-URR) - 0.008 \cdot t) + (4-3.5 (1-URR)) \cdot \frac {0.55 \cdot UF}{V}$

The $(0.008 \cdot t)$ term is a function of the dialysis session duration (t), and adjusts for the amount of urea generated during the dialysis session. The second term, $(4-3.5 (1-URR)) \cdot \frac {0.55 \cdot UF}{V}$ adjusts for the additional urea that is cleared from the body through volume contraction.

Because $\frac {0.55 \cdot UF}{V}$ can be approximated by $\frac{UF}{W}$, where UF = ultrafiltrate removed during dialysis (estimated as the weight lost during the treatment) and W = postdialysis body weight, and because dialysis sessions given 3 times per week are usually about 3.5 hours long, the above equation can be simplified to:

$\frac{K \cdot t}{V} = -ln ((1-URR) - 0.03) + (4-3.5 (1-URR)) \cdot \frac {UF}{W}$

== Nomogram relating Kt/V and URR ==

Instead of equations, a nomogram can be used to easily estimate Kt/V from the URR in clinical practice. To use the nomogram, one needs to know the postdialysis weight (W) as well as the amount of weight (fluid) loss during the dialysis session (UF). First, find the URR on the vertical axis, then move over to the proper isopleth (curved line) depending on the amount of weight lost during dialysis (UF/W). Then drop down to the horizontal axis to read off the Kt/V value:

== Limitations of URR vs. Kt/V ==
The URR is designed to measure the amount of dialysis given when the dialysis clearance of urea greatly exceeds the urea generation rate. In continuous hemodialysis or in peritoneal dialysis, for example, a considerable amount of dialysis is delivered, but the urea level remains roughly constant after the initial treatment of uremia, so the URR is essentially zero. In long slow overnight dialysis, if simplified equations are used, the URR also underestimates the amount of dialysis due to urea generation during the long dialytic session. For this reason, the kinetically modeled Kt/V is always recommended as the best measure of dialysis adequacy. The Kt/V, even that derived by formal modeling, is primarily based on the URR, and so it contains little additional information in terms of the amount of dialysis that was delivered. Since the URR and Kt/V are so closely related, their predictive power in terms of patient outcome is similar. However, use of Kt/V and urea modeling in general allows for comparing expected with predicted dose of dialysis, which can be used to analyze dialysis treatments and dialyzer clearances and in troubleshooting and quality control activities. Also, Kt/V permits calculation of the urea generation rate, which can give clues about a patient's protein intake.

== Minimally adequate dose in terms of URR ==
In the standard 3x/week hemodialysis schedule a URR of 65% is considered the minimum acceptable dose, corresponding to a minimum Kt/V of 1.2 When dialysis is given more frequently than three times a week, the minimum acceptable URR is lower; because more dialysis treatments are given over the week, the dose of dialysis for each treatment does not need to be as large. Also minimally acceptable values for URR (and Kt/V) can be reduced in patients who have substantial amounts of residual renal function.
