= Gambro =

Global medical technology company

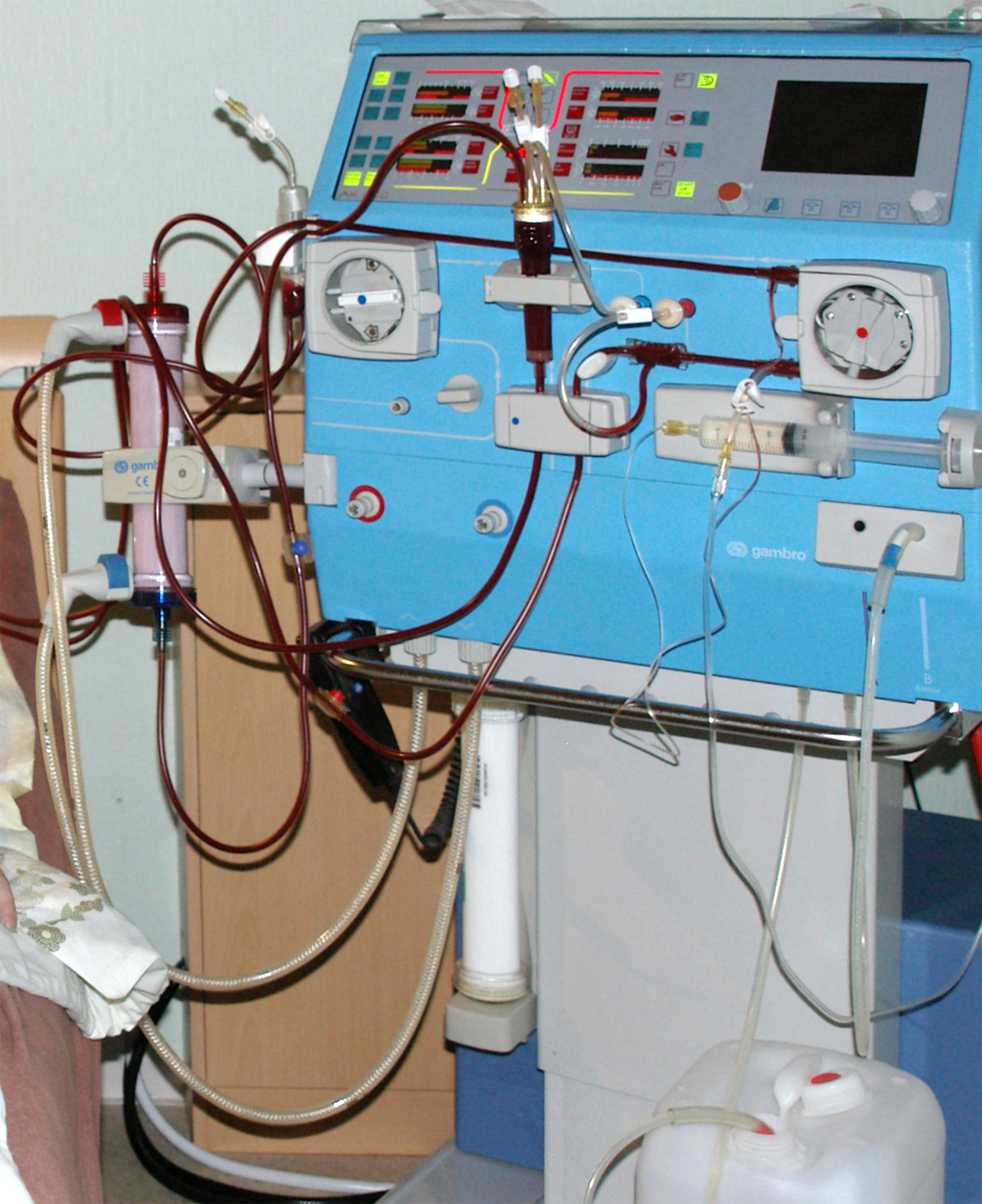
- Type: Business unit of Baxter International.
- Industry: Healthcare
- Founded: 1964 in Lund by Holger Crafoord
- Headquarters: Deerfield, Illinois, U.S.
- Number of employees: approx. 7,500
- Parent: Baxter International
- Website: www.gambro.com

Gambro is a global medical technology company that manufactures products for dialysis treatment. The company is involved in developing, manufacturing and supplying products and therapies for kidney and liver dialysis, myeloma kidney therapy, and other extracorporeal therapies for chronic and acute patients. Gambro was founded in Lund, Sweden, in 1964 by Holger Crafoord and has around 8,000 employees, production facilities in nine countries, and sales in more than 100 countries.

In September 2013, Baxter International completed its acquisition of Gambro.

== History ==
Professor Nils Alwall invented one of the first artificial kidneys in 1961. Three years later he met industrialist and businessman Holger Crafoord, who was impressed by Alwall's invention and felt compelled to develop and market this life-saving innovation.

The development of single-use artificial kidneys began in Lund, Sweden, and mass production started in 1967 with the "Ad-modum-Alwall" dialyzer. The company adopted the name Gambro, which is the abbreviation of the original Swedish company name: Gamla Brogatans Sjukvårdsaffär Aktiebolag. Roughly translated, this means 'The Old Bridge Street Medical Supplies Company'. The company's first plant outside Sweden was built in Hechingen, Germany, in the 1970s. In 1983, Gambro was listed on the Stockholm Stock Exchange. On 3 April 2006, Indap AB, jointly owned by Swedish investment companies EQT and Investor AB, announced a public cash offer to the shareholders of Gambro to acquire all outstanding shares in the company. The new ownership structure of Gambro became effective in June 2006.

In recent decades, Gambro's range of products and therapies has grown — through the introduction of new products, as well as several acquisitions, such as Hospal in 1987, COBE in 1990, Teraklin in 2004, and the latest addition of CHF Solutions Inc. in 2010. CHF Solutions designs and manufactures therapies and products for treating fluid overload by means of ultrafiltration.

In July 2013, Baxter International's bid for Gambro was approved by EU antitrust regulators.

== Organization ==
Gambro has production facilities in nine countries. The company's newest plant is a manufacturing facility in Opelika, Alabama, USA which started production in 2009. The largest manufacturing facility is located in Hechingen, Germany, employing approximately 1,380 people. Gambro has 350 research and development employees in four locations all over Europe. The company has offices and representatives in more than 100 countries. Around 350,000 chronic renal disease patients are treated with Gambro products every year; this is approximately one quarter of all dialysis patients worldwide.
