= Sieving coefficient =

Mathematical coefficient used in mass transfer calculations

In mass transfer, the sieving coefficient is a measure of equilibration between the concentrations of two mass transfer streams. It is defined as the mean pre- and post-contact concentration of the mass receiving stream divided by the pre- and post-contact concentration of the mass donating stream.

$S = \frac{C_r}{C_d}$

where

- S is the sieving coefficient
- C_{r} is the mean concentration mass receiving stream
- C_{d} is the mean concentration mass donating stream

A sieving coefficient of unity implies that the concentrations of the receiving and donating stream equilibrate, i.e. the out-flow concentrations (post-mass transfer) of the mass donating and receiving stream are equal to one another. Systems with sieving coefficient that are greater than one require an external energy source, as they would otherwise violate the laws of thermodynamics.

Sieving coefficients less than one represent a mass transfer process where the concentrations have not equilibrated.

Contact time between mass streams is important in consider in mass transfer and affects the sieving coefficient.

== In kidney ==
In renal physiology, the glomerular sieving coefficient (GSC) can be expressed as: sieving coefficient = clearance / ultrafiltration rate

== See also ==
- Heat exchanger
- Condenser pinch point
- Sieve
