= Holger Crafoord =

Swedish businessman (1908–1982)

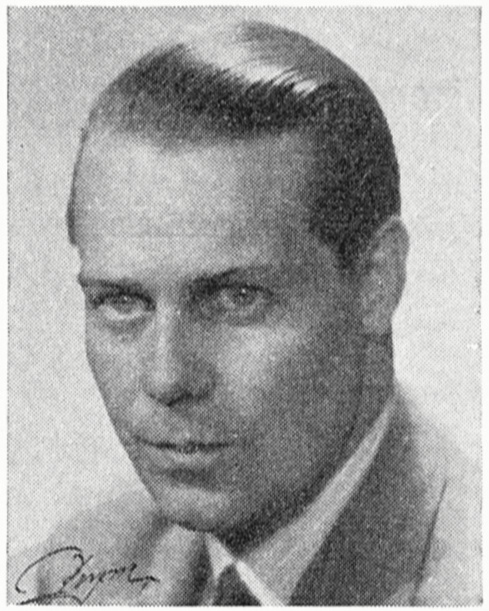
- Born: Alf Erik Holger Lundquist; 25 July 1908; Stockholm, Sweden
- Died: 21 May 1982 (aged 73); Lund, Sweden
- Resting place: Ödestugu Cemetery
- Education: Stockholm School of Economics
- Occupations: Industrialist, patron
- Known for: Founding Gambro, developer of kidney dialysis products
- Spouse: Anna-Greta Löfdahl (m. 1935)
- Children: 3
- Awards: Illis quorum (1982)

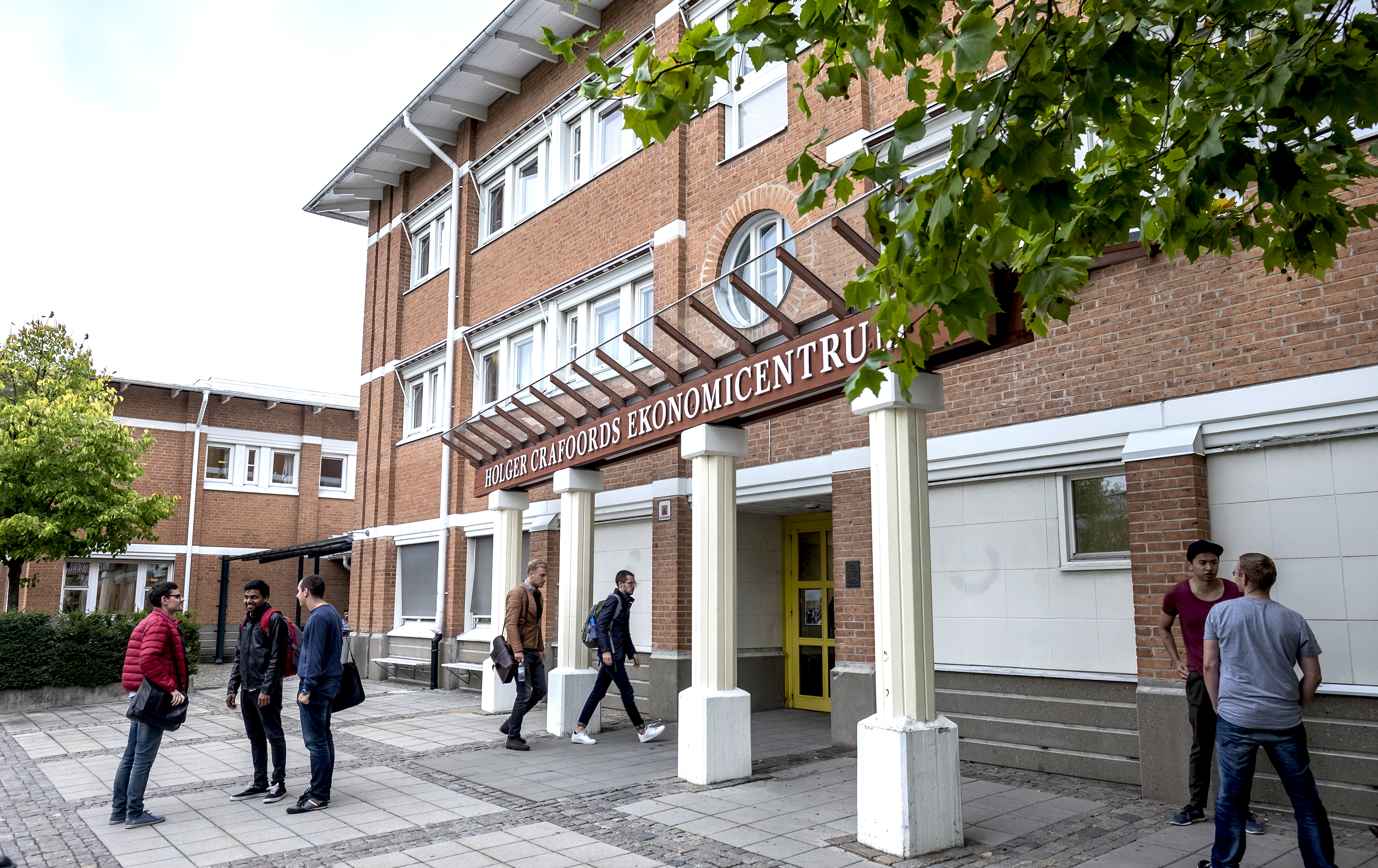
Holger Crafoords Ekonomicentrum, Lund Credit: News Øresund – Johan Wessman

Alf Erik Holger Crafoord (né Lundquist; 25 July 1908 – 21 May 1982) was a Swedish industrialist and patron. He founded Gambro, which developed and commercialised the artificial kidney. He also established the Crafoord Foundation, the proceeds of which fund the Crafoord Prize for scientific research.

== Biography ==
Holger Crafoord was born in Stockholm, the son of Alfred Lundquist (1882–1927), an army officer, and Hanna Lundquist née Johansson (1883–1965). The marriage is said to have been short-lived, and Hanna Lundquist supported herself and her son in meager circumstances as the proprietor of a grocery store. She later remarried ship engineer Harry Crafoord (1881–1935), who adopted his stepson. Crafoord attended Palmgrenska samskolan and Östra Real in Stockholm growing up.

After graduating from the Stockholm School of Economics in 1930, Crafoord started working at Ruben Rausing's Åkerlund & Rausing the same year. In 1935, Crafoord married Anna-Greta Crafoord née Löfdal (1914–1994) and they had three daughters: Birgitta, Katarina, and Margareta.

Crafoord was the director of Östanå pappersbruk paper mill for a number of years. He was involved in a number of organizations, including as a board member of the Association of Swedish Lithographic Printers, head of a paper packaging employers' association, head of the Cultural History Society, and head of the board of a bank.

At Åkerlund & Rausing, he was Managing Director from 1946 to 1968 and Chairman of the Board from 1968 to 1972. During his time at the company, the food packaging company Tetra Pak was established in 1950. By later selling his stake in the company, he freed up a considerable amount of capital which he could use to build up the international company Gambro.

Crafoord suffered from asthma and severe rheumatoid arthritis for a number of years.

In 1982, he died in Lund of sepsis. He is buried at Ödestugu cemetery in Jönköping Municipality.

== Gambro ==
Professor Nils Alwall had been working since the 1940s on an artificial kidney and dialysis treatments to filter the blood of kidney patients. The filters of the time required a long cleaning process to render them suitable for reuse. In 1961, after being unable to help two patients due to these limitations, Alwall happened to meet Crafoord at a dinner. What Alwall needed was someone to produce disposable filters; Crafoord had experience in the manufacturing and plastics industry and was very interested in financing the product, which could save lives. In 1964, Crafoord founded the company Gambro – originally Gamla Brogatans Sjukvårdsaffär AB – which developed and three years later commercialized the invention.

In 1981, Gambro "diversified into the heart-lung product area and built up a special network of suppliers", developing other technologies for treating blood outside the body (extracorporeally), for example in connection with heart surgery, and blood component technology, which separates blood into different components and then uses some of them in the care of cancer patients.

== Crafoord Foundation and Prize ==
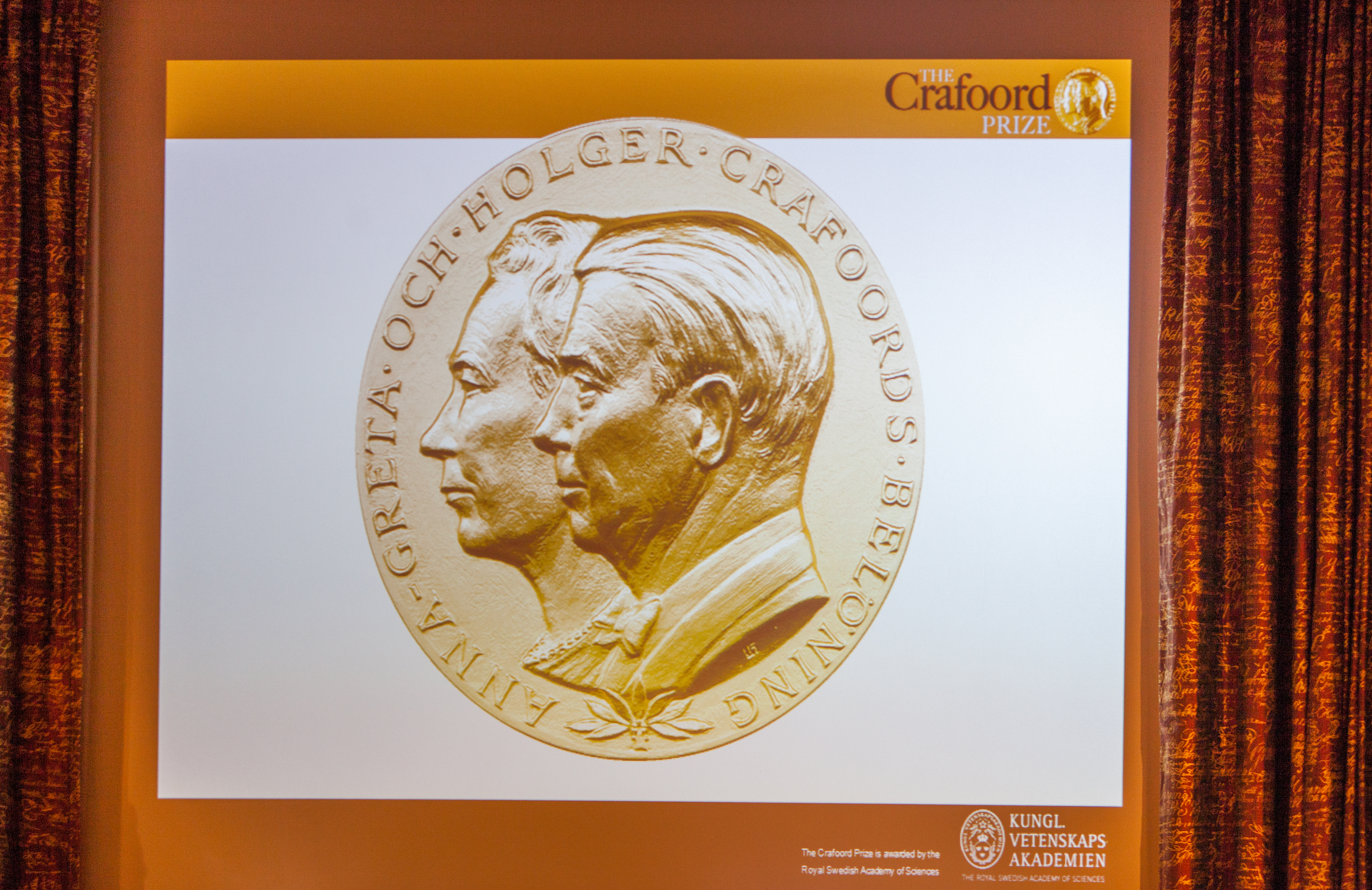
Crafoord Prize

Crafoord laid the foundations for the Crafoord Foundation in 1980 and the Crafoord Prize which has been awarded since 1982 and was intended to supplement fields awarded the Nobel Prize, with awards for arthritis research as well. He was the founder of the Holger Crafoord Economics Center in Lund, which later became the Lund University School of Economics and Management.

== Awards ==
- (Sweden) Illis quorum, 8th size (1982)
- (Sweden) Commander Grand Cross of the Order of the Polar Star (3 December 1974)

== Honours ==
- Member of the Society of Sciences in Lund (1951)
- Member of the Royal Physiographic Society in Lund (1960)
- Royal Society of the Humanities at Lund (1964)
- Honorary Doctor of Economics, Lund University (1972)
- Honorary Doctor of Medicine, Lund University(1976)
