= Hemodialysis =

Medical procedure for purifying blood

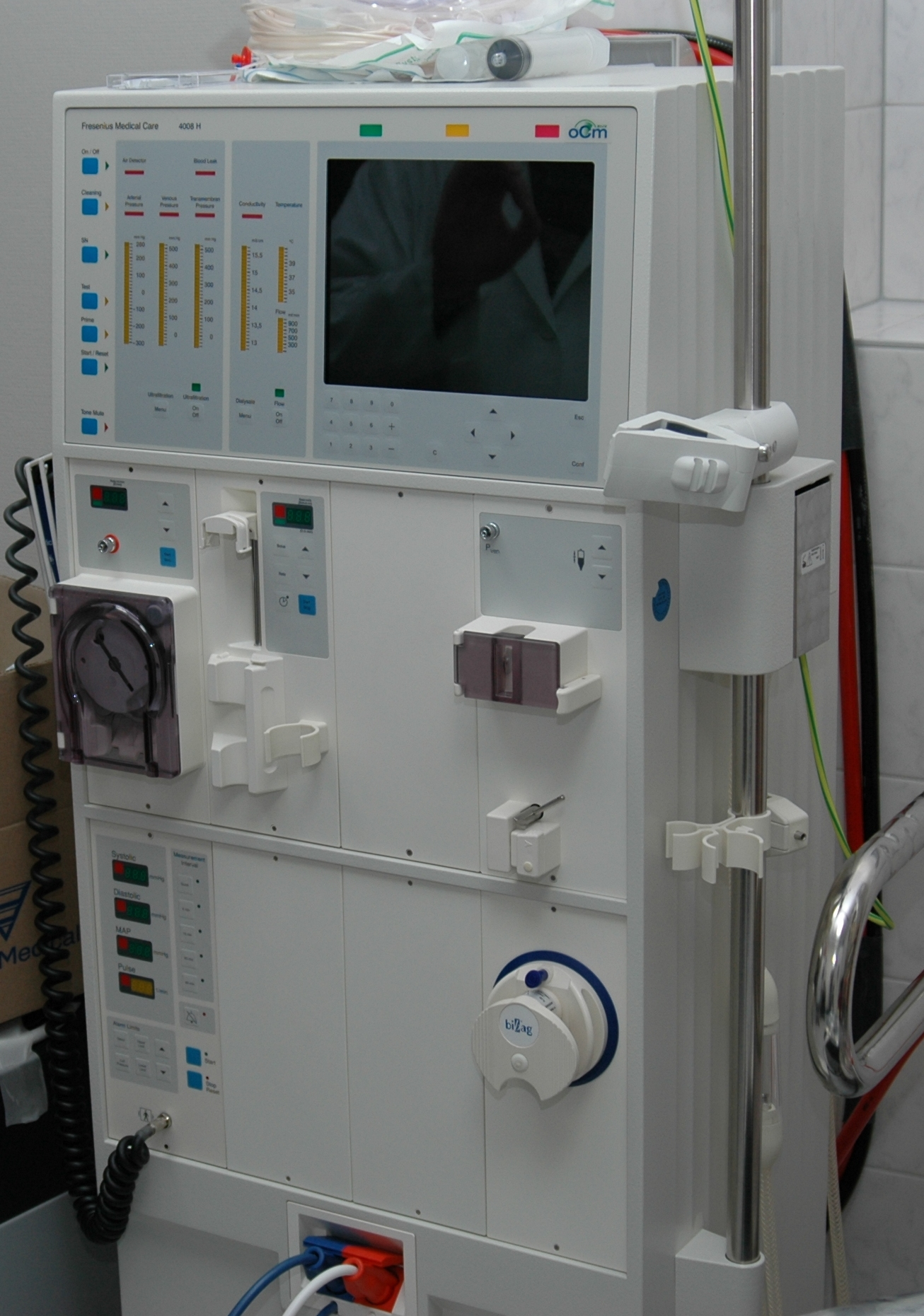
- Hemodialysis machine
- Other names: kidney dialysis renal dialysis
- Specialty: Nephrology

Hemodialysis, also spelled haemodialysis, or simply dialysis, is a process of filtering the blood of a person whose kidneys are not working normally. This type of dialysis achieves the extracorporeal removal of waste products such as creatinine and urea and free water from the blood when the kidneys are in a state of kidney failure. Hemodialysis is one of three renal replacement therapies (the other two being kidney transplant and peritoneal dialysis). An alternative method for extracorporeal separation of blood components such as plasma or cells is apheresis.

Hemodialysis can be an outpatient or inpatient therapy. Routine hemodialysis is conducted in a dialysis outpatient facility, either a purpose-built room in a hospital or a dedicated, stand-alone clinic. Less frequently, hemodialysis is done at home. Dialysis treatments in a clinic are initiated and managed by specialized staff made up of nurses and technicians; dialysis treatments at home can be self-initiated and managed or done jointly with the assistance of a trained helper who is usually a family member.

== Medical uses ==
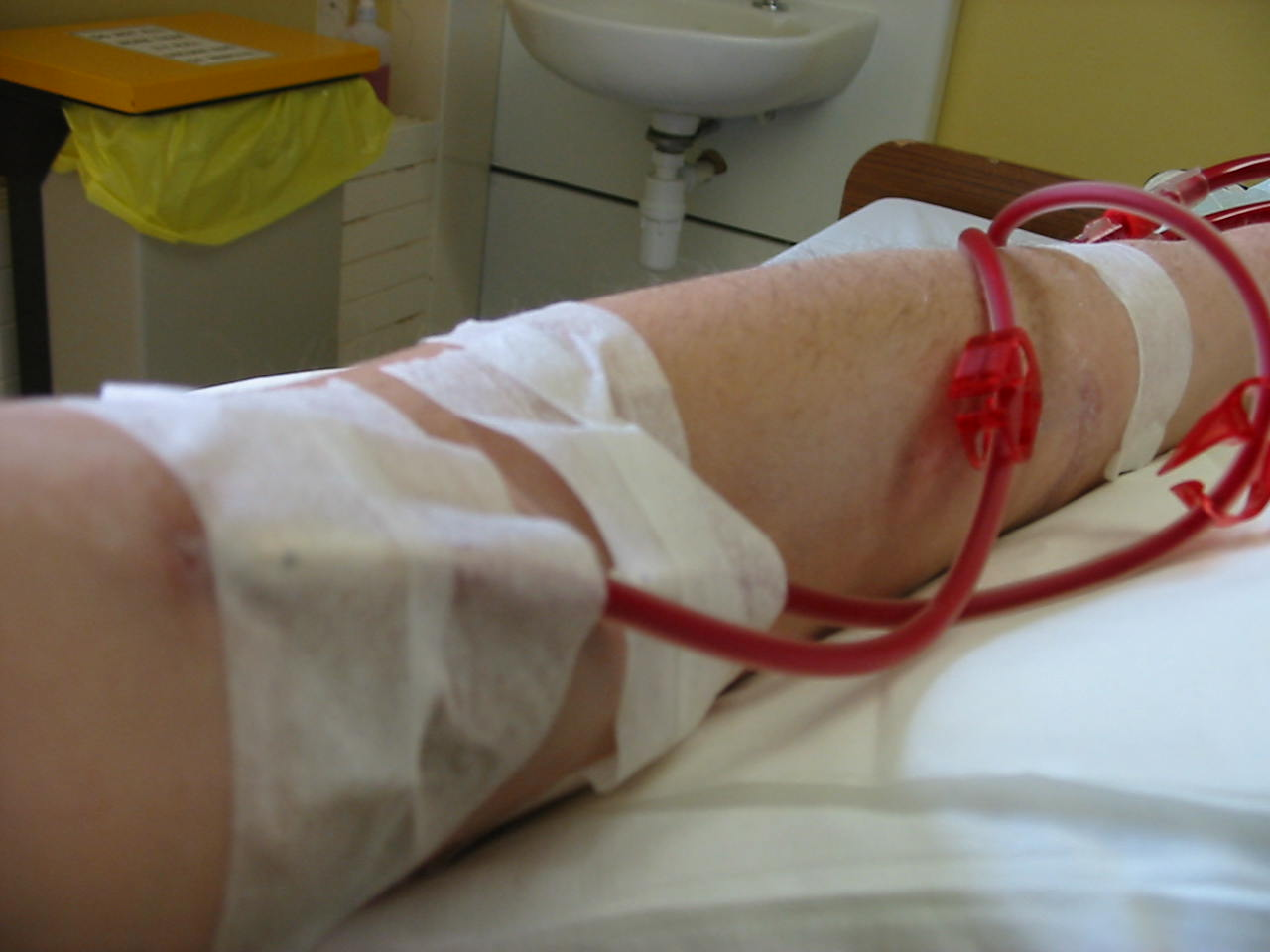
Hemodialysis in progress

Hemodialysis is the choice of renal replacement therapy for people who need dialysis acutely, and for many patients as maintenance therapy. It provides excellent, rapid clearance of solutes.

A nephrologist (a medical kidney specialist) decides when hemodialysis is needed and the various parameters for a dialysis treatment. These include frequency (how many treatments per week), length of each treatment, and the blood and dialysis solution flow rates, as well as the size of the dialyzer. The composition of the dialysis solution is also sometimes adjusted in terms of its sodium, potassium, and bicarbonate levels. In general, the larger the body size of an individual, the more dialysis they will need. In North America and the UK, 3–4 hour treatments (sometimes up to 5 hours for larger patients) given 3 times a week are typical. For some patients, nephrologists may suggest an incremental approach, especially for those with substantial residual kidney function at the time of dialysis initiation. With "incremental hemodialysis", the initial dialysis prescription begins with fewer and/or shorter sessions per week—usually one or two 3 hour session—and gradually increases frequency and duration as kidney function declines. Four sessions per week may be prescribed for larger patients, as well as patients who have trouble with fluid overload.

There is growing interest in short daily home hemodialysis, which is 1.5 – 4 hr sessions given 5–7 times per week, usually at home. There is also interest in nocturnal dialysis, which involves dialyzing a patient, usually at home, for 8–10 hours per night, 3–6 nights per week. Nocturnal in-center dialysis, 3–4 times per week, was first described more than 40 years ago, and is offered at some dialysis units.

== Adverse effects ==
=== Disadvantages ===
- Restricts independence, as people undergoing this procedure cannot travel around because of supplies' availability
- Requires more supplies such as high water quality and electricity
- Requires reliable technology like dialysis machines
- The procedure is complicated and requires that care givers have more knowledge
- Requires time to set up and clean dialysis machines, and expense with machines and associated staff

=== Complications ===
==== Fluid shifts ====
Hemodialysis often involves fluid removal (through ultrafiltration), because most patients with renal failure pass little or no urine. Side effects caused by removing too much fluid and/or removing fluid too rapidly include low blood pressure, fatigue, chest pains, leg-cramps, nausea and headaches. These symptoms can occur during the treatment and can persist post treatment; they are sometimes collectively referred to as the dialysis hangover or dialysis washout. The severity of these symptoms is usually proportionate to the amount and speed of fluid removal. However, the impact of a given amount or rate of fluid removal can vary greatly from person to person and day to day. These side effects can be avoided and/or their severity lessened by limiting fluid intake between treatments or increasing the dose of dialysis e.g. dialyzing more often or longer per treatment than the standard three times a week, 3–4 hours per treatment schedule.

==== Access-related ====
Since hemodialysis requires access to the circulatory system, patients undergoing hemodialysis may expose their circulatory system to microbes, which can lead to bacteremia, an infection affecting the heart valves (endocarditis) or an infection affecting the bones (osteomyelitis). The risk of infection varies depending on the type of access used (see below). Bleeding may also occur, again the risk varies depending on the type of access used. Infections can be minimized by strictly adhering to infection control best practices.

==== Venous needle dislodgement ====
Venous needle dislodgement (VND) is a fatal complication of hemodialysis where the patient experiences rapid blood loss due to a faltering attachment of the needle to the venous access point.

==== Anticoagulation-related ====
Unfractionated heparin (UHF) is the most commonly used anticoagulant in hemodialysis, as it is generally well tolerated and can be quickly reversed with protamine sulfate. Low-molecular weight heparin (LMWH) is however, becoming increasingly popular and is now the norm in western Europe. Compared to UHF, LMWH has the advantage of an easier mode of administration and reduced bleeding but the effect cannot be easily reversed. Heparin can infrequently cause a low platelet count due to a reaction called heparin-induced thrombocytopenia (HIT). The risk of HIT is lower with LMWH compared to UHF. In such patients, alternative anticoagulants may be used. Even though HIT causes a low platelet count it can paradoxically predispose thrombosis. When comparing UHF to LMWH for the risk of adverse effects, the evidence is uncertain as to which treatment approach to thin blood has the least side effects and what is the ideal treatment strategy for preventing blood clots during hemodialysis. In patients at high risk of bleeding, dialysis can be done without anticoagulation.

==== First-use syndrome ====
First-use syndrome is a rare but severe anaphylactic reaction to the artificial kidney. Its symptoms include sneezing, wheezing, shortness of breath, back pain, chest pain, or sudden death. It can be caused by residual sterilant in the artificial kidney or the material of the membrane itself. In recent years, the incidence of first-use syndrome has decreased, due to an increased use of gamma irradiation, steam sterilization, or electron-beam radiation instead of chemical sterilants, and the development of new semipermeable membranes of higher biocompatibility. New methods of processing previously acceptable components of dialysis must always be considered. For example, in 2008, a series of first-use type of reactions, including deaths, occurred due to heparin contaminated during the manufacturing process with oversulfated chondroitin sulfate.

==== Cardiovascular ====
Long term complications of hemodialysis include hemodialysis-associated amyloidosis, neuropathy and various forms of heart disease. Increasing the frequency and length of treatments has been shown to improve fluid overload and enlargement of the heart that is commonly seen in such patients.

==== Vitamin deficiency ====
Folate deficiency can occur in some patients having hemodialysis.

==== Nutritional consequences ====
Hemodialysis is associated with significant nutritional impairment. Protein–energy wasting (PEW) affects approximately 28–54% of patients undergoing hemodialysis and is characterized by loss of fat-free mass and energy reserves resulting from inadequate dietary intake, increased protein catabolism and persistent inflammation. These processes interact in a self-perpetuating cycle known as the malnutrition–inflammation–atherosclerosis (MIA) syndrome, which is closely linked to sarcopenia, frailty and increased mortality.

The dialysis session itself contributes to nutritional decline through the loss of amino acids (around 12 g per session), water-soluble vitamins and trace elements, along with hormonal alterations affecting appetite, gastrointestinal symptoms and altered taste perception. Conventional markers such as serum albumin and body mass index tend to underestimate true nutritional risk, particularly in older adults, as they are influenced by inflammation, fluid shifts and sarcopenic obesity. Morphofunctional tools such as muscle ultrasound, multifrequency bioelectrical impedance analysis, handgrip dynamometry and the Malnutrition–Inflammation Score (MIS) provide a more comprehensive assessment.

Malnutrition in hemodialysis is consistently associated with higher hospitalization rates, lower treatment tolerance, reduced quality of life and decreased survival. Reported global non-adherence to dietary recommendations is around 60%, and current evidence supports a shift from the traditional "universal renal diet" towards flexible, patient-centred and function-oriented nutritional models.

==== Electrolyte imbalances ====
Although a dialysate fluid, which is a solution containing diluted electrolytes, is employed for the filtration of blood, haemodialysis can cause an electrolyte imbalance. These imbalances can derive from abnormal concentrations of potassium (hypokalemia, hyperkalemia), and sodium (hyponatremia, hypernatremia). These electrolyte imbalances are associated with increased cardiovascular mortality.

== Mechanism and technique ==
Semipermeable membrane

The principle of hemodialysis is the same as other methods of dialysis; it involves diffusion of solutes across a semipermeable membrane. Hemodialysis utilizes counter current flow, where the dialysate is flowing in the opposite direction to blood flow in the extracorporeal circuit. Counter-current flow maintains the concentration gradient across the membrane at a maximum and increases the efficiency of the dialysis.

Fluid removal (ultrafiltration) is achieved by altering the hydrostatic pressure of the dialysate compartment, causing free water and some dissolved solutes to move across the membrane along a created pressure gradient.

The dialysis solution that is used may be a sterilized solution of mineral ions and is called dialysate. Urea and other waste products, including potassium and phosphate, diffuse into the dialysis solution. However, concentrations of sodium and chloride are similar to those of normal plasma to prevent loss. Sodium bicarbonate is added in a higher concentration than plasma to correct blood acidity. A small amount of glucose is also commonly used. The concentration of electrolytes in the dialysate is adjusted depending on the patient's status before the dialysis. If a high concentration of sodium is added to the dialysate, the patient can become thirsty and end up accumulating body fluids, which can lead to heart damage. On the other hand, low concentrations of sodium in the dialysate solution have been associated with low blood pressure and intradialytic (occurring or carried out during hemodialysis) weight gain, which are markers of improved outcomes. However, the benefits of using a low concentration of sodium have not been demonstrated yet, since these patients can also develop cramps, intradialytic hypotension, and low sodium in serum, which are symptoms associated with high mortality risk.

Note that this is a different process to the related technique of hemofiltration.

=== Access ===
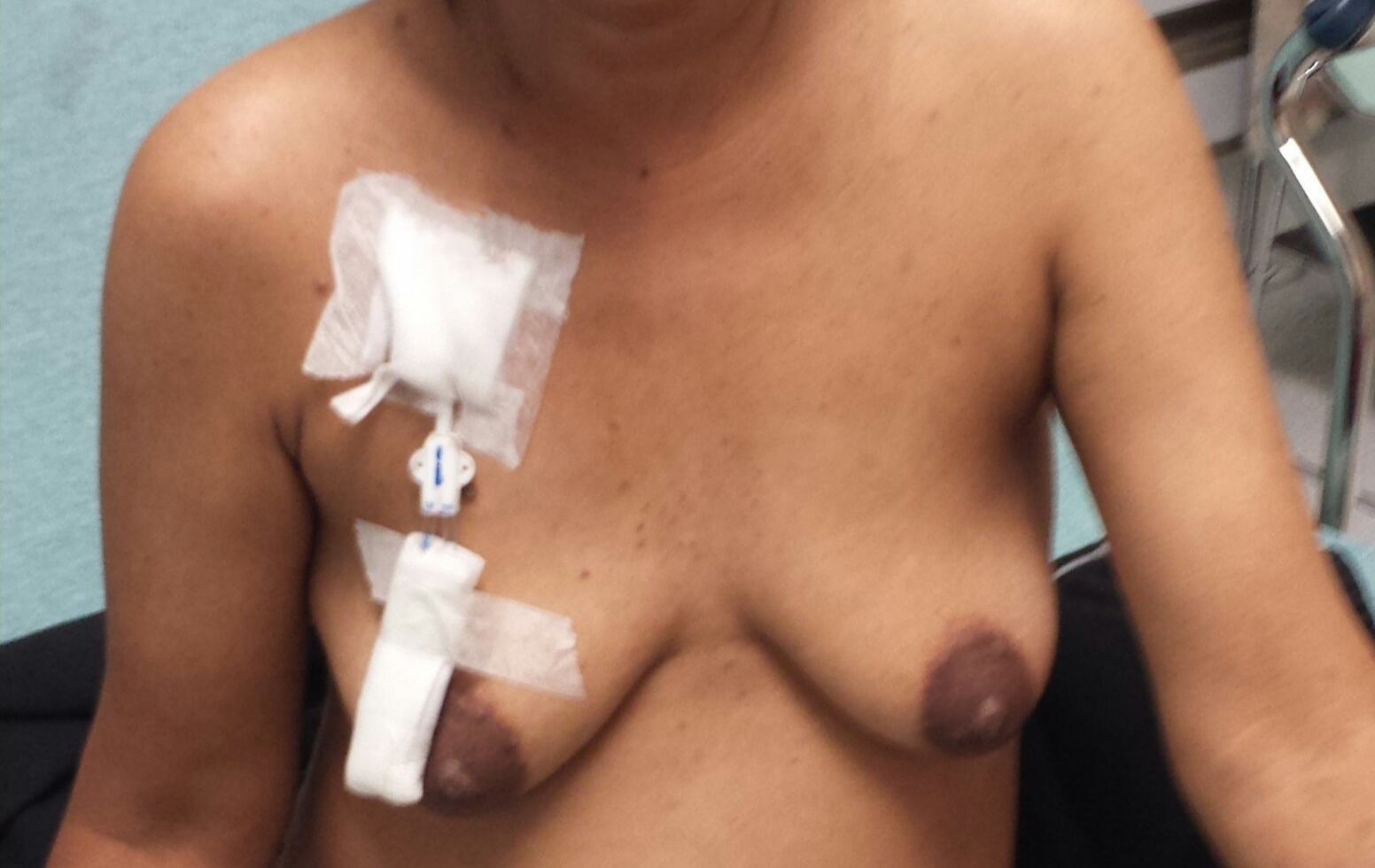
Permacath for dialysis

Three primary methods are used to gain access to the blood for hemodialysis: an intravenous catheter, an arteriovenous fistula (AV) and a synthetic graft. The type of access is influenced by factors such as the expected time course of a patient's renal failure and the condition of their vasculature. Patients may have multiple access procedures, usually because an AV fistula or graft is maturing and a catheter is still being used. The placement of a catheter is usually done under light sedation, while fistulas and grafts require an operation.

== Types ==
There are three types of hemodialysis: conventional hemodialysis, daily hemodialysis, and nocturnal hemodialysis. Below is an adaptation and summary from a brochure of The Ottawa Hospital.

=== Conventional hemodialysis ===
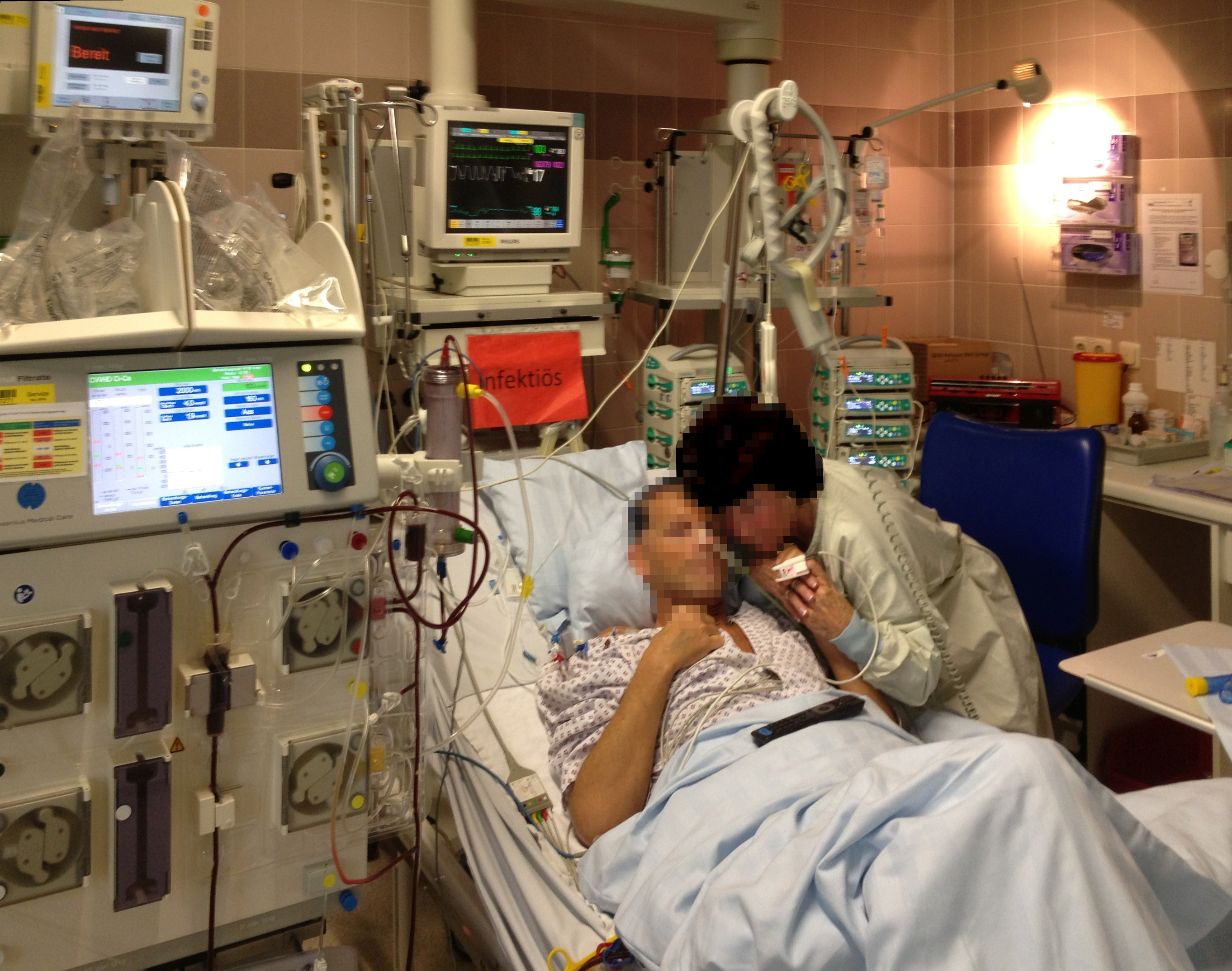
A patient of an intensive care unit in a German hospital in 2015 who had a nearly complete dysfunction of the kidneys due to a severe sepsis. The hemodialysis had to be carried out with a portable machine (left) on rollers near the bed, because the patient was too weak to leave the bed. Without this treatment, he would not have survived.

Conventional hemodialysis is usually done three times per week, for about three to four hours for each treatment (Sometimes five hours for larger patients), during which the patient's blood is drawn out through a tube at a rate of 200–400 mL/min. The tube is connected to a 15, 16, or 17 gauge needle inserted in the dialysis fistula or graft, or connected to one port of a dialysis catheter. The blood is then pumped through the dialyzer, and then the processed blood is pumped back into the patient's bloodstream through another tube (connected to a second needle or port). During the procedure, the patient's blood pressure is closely monitored, and if it becomes low, or the patient develops any other signs of low blood volume such as nausea, the dialysis attendant can administer extra fluid through the machine. During the treatment, the patient's entire blood volume (about 5 L) circulates through the machine every 15 minutes. During this process, the dialysis patient is exposed to a week's worth of water for the average person.

=== Daily hemodialysis ===
Daily hemodialysis is typically used by those patients who do their own dialysis at home. It is less stressful (more gentle) but does require more frequent access. This is simple with catheters, but more problematic with fistulas or grafts. The "buttonhole technique" can be used for fistulas, but not grafts, requiring frequent access. Daily hemodialysis is usually done for 2 hours each day, six days a week.

=== Nocturnal hemodialysis ===
The procedure of nocturnal hemodialysis is similar to conventional hemodialysis except it is performed three to six nights a week and between six and ten hours per session while the patient sleeps.

== Equipment ==
Schematic of a hemodialysis circuit

The hemodialysis machine pumps the patient's blood and the dialysate through the dialyzer. The newest dialysis machines on the market are highly computerized and continuously monitor an array of safety-critical parameters, including blood (QB) and dialysate (QD) flow rates; dialysis solution conductivity, temperature, and pH; and analysis of the dialysate for evidence of blood leakage or presence of air. Any reading that is out of normal range triggers an audible alarm to alert the patient-care technician who is monitoring the patient. Manufacturers of dialysis machines include companies such as Nipro, Fresenius, Gambro, Baxter, B. Braun, NxStage and Bellco. QB to QD flow rates have to reach 1:2 ratio where QB is set around 250 ml/min and QD is set around 500 ml/min to ensure good dialysis efficiency.

=== Water system ===
An extensive water purification system is critical for hemodialysis. Since dialysis patients are exposed to vast quantities of water, which is mixed with dialysate concentrate to form the dialysate, even trace mineral contaminants or bacterial endotoxins can filter into the patient's blood. Because the damaged kidneys cannot perform their intended function of removing impurities, molecules introduced into the bloodstream from improperly purified water can build up to hazardous levels, causing numerous symptoms or death. Aluminum, chlorine and or chloramines, fluoride, copper, and zinc, as well as bacterial fragments and endotoxins, have all caused problems in this regard.

For this reason, water used in hemodialysis is carefully purified before use. A common water purification system includes a multi stage system.

The water is first softened. Next the water is run through a tank containing activated charcoal to adsorb organic contaminants, and chlorine and chloramines. The water may then be temperature-adjusted if needed. Primary purification is then done by forcing water through a membrane with very tiny pores, a so-called reverse osmosis membrane. This lets the water pass, but holds back even very small solutes such as electrolytes. Final removal of leftover electrolytes is done in some water systems by passing the water through an electrodeionization (EDI) device, which removes any leftover anions or cations and replace them with hydroxyl and hydrogen ions, respectively, leaving ultrapure water.

Even this degree of water purification may be insufficient. The trend lately is to pass this final purified water (after mixing with dialysate concentrate) through an ultrafiltration membrane or absolute filter. This provides another layer of protection by removing impurities, especially those of bacterial origin, that may have accumulated in the water after its passage through the original water purification system.

=== Dialysate ===
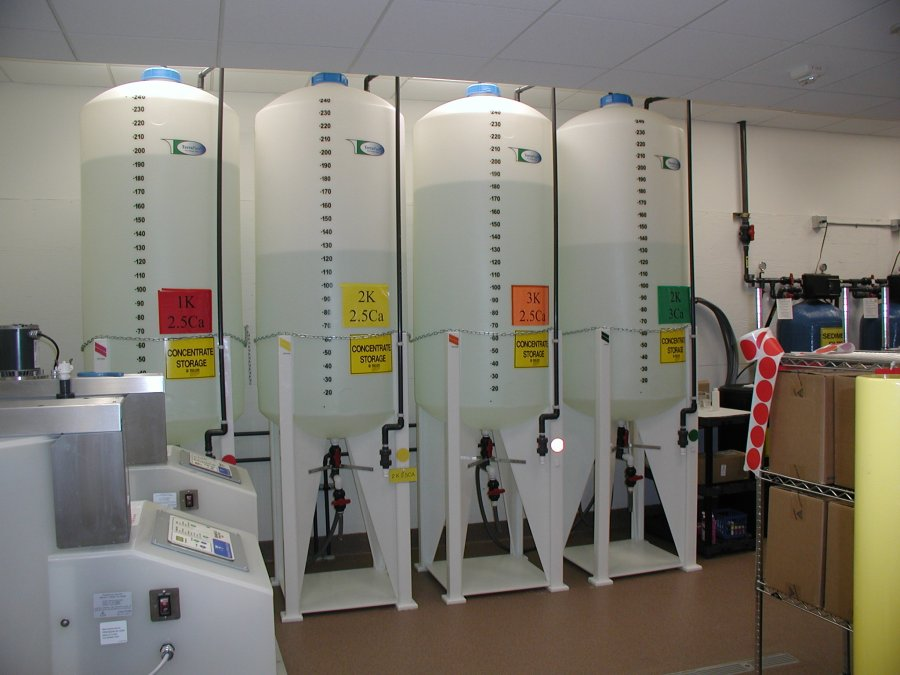
A hemodialysis unit's dialysate solution tanks

Once purified water is mixed with dialysate (also called dialysis fluid) concentrate consisting of: sodium, potassium, calcium, magnesium and dextrose mixed in an acid solution; this solution is mixed with the purified water and a chemical buffer. This forms the dialysate solution, which contains the basic electrolytes found in human blood. This dialysate solution contains charged ions that conducts electricity. During dialysis, the conductivity of dialysis solution is continuously monitored to ensure that the water and dialysate concentrate are being mixed in the proper proportions. Both excessively concentrated dialysis solution and excessively dilute solution can cause severe clinical problems. Chemical buffers such as bicarbonate or lactate can alternatively be added to regulate the pH of the dialysate. Both buffers can stabilize the pH of the solution at a physiological level with no negative impacts on the patient. There is some evidence of a reduction in the incidence of heart and blood problems and high blood pressure events when using bicarbonate as the pH buffer compared to lactate. However, the mortality rates after using both buffers do not show a significant difference.

=== Dialyzer ===
The dialyzer is the piece of equipment that filters the blood. Almost all dialyzers in use today are of the hollow-fiber variety. A cylindrical bundle of hollow fibers, whose walls are composed of semi-permeable membrane, is anchored at each end into potting compound (a sort of glue). This assembly is then put into a clear plastic cylindrical shell with four openings. One opening or blood port at each end of the cylinder communicates with each end of the bundle of hollow fibers. This forms the "blood compartment" of the dialyzer. Two other ports are cut into the side of the cylinder. These communicate with the space around the hollow fibers, the "dialysate compartment." Blood is pumped via the blood ports through this bundle of very thin capillary-like tubes, and the dialysate is pumped through the space surrounding the fibers. Pressure gradients are applied when necessary to move fluid from the blood to the dialysate compartment.

== Membrane and flux ==
Dialyzer membranes come with different pore sizes. Those with smaller pore size are called "low-flux" and those with larger pore sizes are called "high-flux." Some larger molecules, such as beta-2-microglobulin, are not removed at all with low-flux dialyzers; lately, the trend has been to use high-flux dialyzers. However, such dialyzers require newer dialysis machines and high-quality dialysis solution to control the rate of fluid removal properly and to prevent backflow of dialysis solution impurities into the patient through the membrane.

Dialyzer membranes used to be made primarily of cellulose (derived from cotton linter). The surface of such membranes was not very biocompatible, because exposed hydroxyl groups would activate complement in the blood passing by the membrane. Therefore, the basic, "unsubstituted" cellulose membrane was modified. One change was to cover these hydroxyl groups with acetate groups (cellulose acetate); another was to mix in some compounds that would inhibit complement activation at the membrane surface (modified cellulose). The original "unsubstituted cellulose" membranes are no longer in wide use, whereas cellulose acetate and modified cellulose dialyzers are still used. Cellulosic membranes can be made in either low-flux or high-flux configuration, depending on their pore size.

Another group of membranes is made from synthetic materials, using polymers such as polyarylethersulfone, polyamide, polyvinylpyrrolidone, polycarbonate, and polyacrylonitrile. These synthetic membranes activate complement to a lesser degree than unsubstituted cellulose membranes. However, they are in general more hydrophobic which leads to increased adsorption of proteins to the membrane surface which in turn can lead to complement system activation. Synthetic membranes can be made in either low- or high-flux configuration, but most are high-flux.

Nanotechnology is being used in some of the most recent high-flux membranes to create a uniform pore size. The goal of high-flux membranes is to pass relatively large molecules such as beta-2-microglobulin (MW 11,600 daltons), but not to pass albumin (MW ~66,400 daltons). Every membrane has pores in a range of sizes. As pore size increases, some high-flux dialyzers begin to let albumin pass out of the blood into the dialysate. This is thought to be undesirable, although one school of thought holds that removing some albumin may be beneficial in terms of removing protein-bound uremic toxins.

=== Membrane flux and outcome ===
Whether using a high-flux dialyzer improves patient outcomes is somewhat controversial, but several important studies have suggested that it has clinical benefits. The NIH-funded HEMO trial compared survival and hospitalizations in patients randomized to dialysis with either low-flux or high-flux membranes. Although the primary outcome (all-cause mortality) did not reach statistical significance in the group randomized to use high-flux membranes, several secondary outcomes were better in the high-flux group. A recent Cochrane analysis concluded that benefit of membrane choice on outcomes has not yet been demonstrated. A collaborative randomized trial from Europe, the MPO (Membrane Permeabilities Outcomes) study, comparing mortality in patients just starting dialysis using either high-flux or low-flux membranes, found a nonsignificant trend to improved survival in those using high-flux membranes, and a survival benefit in patients with lower serum albumin levels or in diabetics.

=== Membrane flux and beta-2-microglobulin amyloidosis ===
High-flux dialysis membranes and/or intermittent internal on-line hemodiafiltration (iHDF) may also be beneficial in reducing complications of beta-2-microglobulin accumulation. Because beta-2-microglobulin is a large molecule, with a molecular weight of about 11,600 daltons, it does not pass at all through low-flux dialysis membranes. Beta-2-M is removed with high-flux dialysis, but is removed even more efficiently with IHDF. After several years (usually at least 5–7), patients on hemodialysis begin to develop complications from beta-2-M accumulation, including carpal tunnel syndrome, bone cysts, and deposits of this amyloid in joints and other tissues. Beta-2-M amyloidosis can cause very serious complications, including spondyloarthropathy, and often is associated with shoulder joint problems. Observational studies from Europe and Japan have suggested that using high-flux membranes in dialysis mode, or IHDF, reduces beta-2-M complications in comparison to regular dialysis using a low-flux membrane.

=== Dialyzers and efficiency ===
Dialyzers come in many different sizes. A larger dialyzer with a larger membrane area (A) will usually remove more solutes than a smaller dialyzer, especially at high blood flow rates. This also depends on the membrane permeability coefficient K_{0} for the solute in question. So dialyzer efficiency is usually expressed as the K_{0}A – the product of permeability coefficient and area. Most dialyzers have membrane surface areas of 0.8 to 2.2 square meters, and values of K_{0}A ranging from about 500 to 1500 mL/min. K_{0}A, expressed in mL/min, can be thought of as the maximum clearance of a dialyzer at very high blood and dialysate flow rates.

=== Reuse of dialyzers ===
The dialyzer may either be discarded after each treatment or be reused. Reuse requires an extensive procedure of high-level disinfection. Reused dialyzers are not shared between patients. There was an initial controversy about whether reusing dialyzers worsened patient outcomes. The consensus today is that reuse of dialyzers, if done carefully and properly, produces similar outcomes to single use of dialyzers.

Dialyzer Reuse is a practice that has been around since the invention of the product. This practice includes the cleaning of a used dialyzer to be reused multiple times for the same patient. Dialysis clinics reuse dialyzers to become more economical and reduce the high costs of "single-use" dialysis which can be extremely expensive and wasteful. Single used dialyzers are initiated just once and then thrown out creating a large amount of bio-medical waste with no mercy for cost savings. If done right, dialyzer reuse can be very safe for dialysis patients.

There are two ways of reusing dialyzers, manual and automated. Manual reuse involves the cleaning of a dialyzer by hand. The dialyzer is semi-disassembled then flushed repeatedly before being rinsed with water. It is then stored with a liquid disinfectant(PAA) for 18+ hours until its next use. Although many clinics outside the USA use this method, some clinics are switching toward a more automated/streamlined process as the dialysis practice advances. The newer method of automated reuse is achieved by means of a medical device that began in the early 1980s. These devices are beneficial to dialysis clinics that practice reuse – especially for large dialysis clinical entities – because they allow for several back to back cycles per day. The dialyzer is first pre-cleaned by a technician, then automatically cleaned by machine through a step-cycles process until it is eventually filled with liquid disinfectant for storage. Although automated reuse is more effective than manual reuse, newer technology has sparked even more advancement in the process of reuse. When reused over 15 times with current methodology, the dialyzer can lose B2m, middle molecule clearance and fiber pore structure integrity, which have the potential to reduce the effectiveness of the patient's dialysis session. Currently, as of 2010, newer, more advanced reprocessing technology has proven the ability to eliminate the manual pre-cleaning process altogether and has also proven the potential to regenerate (fully restore) all functions of a dialyzer to levels that are approximately equivalent to single-use for more than 40 cycles. As medical reimbursement rates begin to fall even more, many dialysis clinics are continuing to operate effectively with reuse programs especially since the process is easier and more streamlined than before.

== Epidemiology ==
Hemodialysis was one of the most common procedures performed in U.S. hospitals in 2011, occurring in 909,000 stays (a rate of 29 stays per 10,000 population). This was an increase of 68 percent from 1997, when there were 473,000 stays. It was the fifth most common procedure for patients aged 45–64 years.

== History ==
Many have played a role in developing dialysis as a practical treatment for renal failure, starting with Thomas Graham of Glasgow, who first presented the principles of solute transport across a semipermeable membrane in 1854. The artificial kidney was first developed by Abel, Rountree, and Turner in 1913, the first hemodialysis in a human being was by Haas (February 28, 1924) and the artificial kidney was developed into a clinically useful apparatus by Kolff in 1943 to 1945. This research showed that life could be prolonged in patients dying of kidney failure.

Willem Kolff was the first to construct a working dialyzer in 1943. The first successfully treated patient was a 67-year-old woman in uremic coma who regained consciousness after 11 hours of hemodialysis with Kolff's dialyzer in 1945. At the time of its creation, Kolff's goal was to provide life support during recovery from acute renal failure. After World War II ended, Kolff donated the five dialyzers he had made to hospitals around the world, including Mount Sinai Hospital, New York. Kolff gave a set of blueprints for his hemodialysis machine to George Thorn at the Peter Bent Brigham Hospital in Boston. This led to the manufacture of the next generation of Kolff's dialyzer, a stainless steel Kolff-Brigham dialysis machine.

According to McKellar (1999), a significant contribution to renal therapies was made by Canadian surgeon Gordon Murray with the assistance of two doctors, an undergraduate chemistry student, and research staff. Murray's work was conducted simultaneously and independently from that of Kolff. Murray's work led to the first successful artificial kidney built in North America in 1945–46, which was successfully used to treat a 26-year-old woman out of a uraemic coma in Toronto. The less-crude, more compact, second-generation "Murray-Roschlau" dialyser was invented in 1952–53, whose designs were stolen by German immigrant Erwin Halstrup, and passed off as his own (the "Halstrup–Baumann artificial kidney").

By the 1950s, Willem Kolff's invention of the dialyzer was used for acute renal failure, but it was not seen as a viable treatment for patients with stage 5 chronic kidney disease (CKD). At the time, doctors believed it was impossible for patients to have dialysis indefinitely for two reasons. First, they thought no man-made device could replace the function of kidneys over the long term. In addition, a patient undergoing dialysis developed damaged veins and arteries, so that after several treatments, it became difficult to find a vessel to access the patient's blood.

The original Kolff kidney was not very useful clinically, because it did not allow for removal of excess fluid. Swedish professor Nils Alwall encased a modified version of this kidney inside a stainless steel canister, to which a negative pressure could be applied, in this way effecting the first truly practical application of hemodialysis, which was done in 1946 at the University of Lund. Alwall also was arguably the inventor of the arteriovenous shunt for dialysis. He reported this first in 1948 where he used such an arteriovenous shunt in rabbits. Subsequently, he used such shunts, made of glass, as well as his canister-enclosed dialyzer, to treat 1500 patients in renal failure between 1946 and 1960, as reported to the First International Congress of Nephrology held in Evian in September 1960. Alwall was appointed to a newly created Chair of Nephrology at the University of Lund in 1957. Subsequently, he collaborated with Swedish businessman Holger Crafoord to found one of the key companies that would manufacture dialysis equipment in the past 50 years, Gambro. The early history of dialysis has been reviewed by Stanley Shaldon.

Belding H. Scribner, working with the biomechanical engineer Wayne Quinton, modified the glass shunts used by Alwall by making them from Teflon. Another key improvement was to connect them to a short piece of silicone elastomer tubing. This formed the basis of the so-called Scribner shunt, perhaps more properly called the Quinton-Scribner shunt. After treatment, the circulatory access would be kept open by connecting the two tubes outside the body using a small U-shaped Teflon tube, which would shunt the blood from the tube in the artery back to the tube in the vein.

In 1962, Scribner started the world's first outpatient dialysis facility, the Seattle Artificial Kidney Center, later renamed the Northwest Kidney Centers. Immediately the problem arose of who should be given dialysis, since demand far exceeded the capacity of the six dialysis machines at the center. Scribner decided that he would not make the decision about who would receive dialysis and who would not. Instead, the choices would be made by an anonymous committee, which could be viewed as one of the first bioethics committees.

== See also ==
- Aluminium toxicity in people on dialysis
- Dialysis disequilibrium syndrome
