= Hexagonal phase =

Schematic of the molecular organisation in a type I hexagonal lyotropic liquid crystalline phase.

A hexagonal phase of lyotropic liquid crystal is formed by some amphiphilic molecules when they are mixed with water or another polar solvent. In this phase, the amphiphile molecules are aggregated into cylindrical structures of indefinite length and these cylindrical aggregates are disposed on a hexagonal lattice, giving the phase long-range orientational order.

In normal topology hexagonal phases, which are formed by type I amphiphiles, the hydrocarbon chains are contained within the cylindrical aggregates such that the polar-apolar interface has a positive mean curvature. Inverse topology hexagonal phases have water within the cylindrical aggregates and the hydrocarbon chains fill the voids between the hexagonally packed cylinders. Normal topology hexagonal phases are denoted by H_{I} while inverse topology hexagonal phases are denoted by H_{II}. When viewed by polarization microscopy, thin films of both normal and inverse topology hexagonal phases exhibit birefringence, giving rise to characteristic optical textures. Typically, these textures are smoke-like, fan-like or mosaic in appearance. The phases are highly viscous and small air bubbles trapped within the preparation have highly distorted shapes. Size and shapes of lamellar, micellar and hexagonal phases of lipid bilayer phase behavior and mixed lipid polymorphism in aqueous dispersions can be easily identified and characterized by negative staining transmission electron microscopy too.

Smoky optical texture of type I hexagonal phase

Mosaic optical texture of type I hexagonal phase

Mosaic/focal conic optical texture of type I hexagonal phase

== See also ==
- Lamellar phase
- Lipid polymorphism
- Micelle
