= Lamella (cell biology) =

In cellular biology, thin layer, membrane, or plate of tissue

A lamella (pl.: lamellae) in biology refers to a thin layer, membrane or plate of tissue. This is a very broad definition, and can refer to many different structures. Any thin layer of organic tissue can be called a lamella and there is a wide array of functions an individual layer can serve. For example, an intercellular lipid lamella is formed when lamellar disks fuse to form a lamellar sheet. It is believed that these disks are formed from vesicles, giving the lamellar sheet a lipid bilayer that plays a role in water diffusion.

Another instance of cellular lamellae can be seen in chloroplasts. Thylakoid membranes are actually a system of lamellar membranes working together, and are differentiated into different lamellar domains. This lamellar system allows plants to convert light energy into chemical energy. Chloroplasts are characterized by a system of membranes embedded in a hydrophobic proteinaceous matrix, or stroma. The basic unit of the membrane system is a flattened single vesicle called the thylakoid; thylakoids stack into grana. All the thylakoids of a granum are connected with each other, and the grana are connected by intergranal lamellae.

It is placed between the two primary cell walls of two plant cells and made up of intracellular matrix. The lamella comprises a mixture of polygalacturons (D-galacturonic acid) and neutral carbohydrates. It is soluble in the pectinase enzyme.

Lamella, in cell biology, is also used to describe the leading edge of a motile cell, of which the lamellipodia is the most forward portion.

The lipid bilayer core of biological membranes is also called lamellar phase. Thus, each bilayer of multilamellar liposomes and wall of a unilamellar liposome is also referred to as a lamella.

== See also ==
- Middle lamella
- Thylakoid
- Lipid bilayer
