= Ammonium perfluorononanoate =

Surfactant

Names
- IUPAC name Heptadecafluorononanoic acid ammoniate (1:1)

Identifiers
CAS Number	4149-60-4
3D model (JSmol)	Interactive image
ChemSpider	69647
ECHA InfoCard	100.242.185
PubChem CID	160734
CompTox Dashboard (EPA)	DTXSID20880205
- InChI: InChI=1S/C9HF17O2.H3N/c10-2(11,1(27)28)3(12,13)4(14,15)5(16,17)6(18,19)7(20,21)8(22,23)9(24,25)26;/h(H,27,28);1H3 Key: ORBBVPFDROYXQS-UHFFFAOYSA-N; InChI=1/C9HF17O2.H3N/c10-2(11,1(27)28)3(12,13)4(14,15)5(16,17)6(18,19)7(20,21)8(22,23)9(24,25)26;/h(H,27,28);1H3 Key: ORBBVPFDROYXQS-UHFFFAOYAU
- SMILES: FC(F)(C(F)(F)C(=O)O)C(F)(F)C(F)(F)C(F)(F)C(F)(F)C(F)(F)C(F)(F)F.N

Properties
Chemical formula	C_{9}H_{4}F_{17}NO_{2}
Molar mass	481.106
Density	1.753 g/mL
Boiling point	196 °C (385 °F; 469 K)
- Surface tension
CMC	~8.0 mmol/L
- Except where otherwise noted, data are given for materials in their standard state (at 25 °C [77 °F], 100 kPa). Infobox references

Ammonium perfluorononanoate (APFN) is an anionic surfactant that in water forms liquid crystalline phases (Lyotropic liquid crystal). It is the ammonium salt of perfluorononanoic acid.

The phase diagram of APFN/H_{2}O system is delineated by the presence of a lamellar phase and a nematic phase with awide isotropic solution. The nematic phase is of the type I, and the aggregates have a positive and diamagnetic anisotropy. In the presence of a magnetic field, the aggregates align parallel to the field direction. The change of phase at the lamellar-nematic temperature has been ascribed to order-disorder transitions.

== MLV Formation ==
It has recently been shown that the lamellar phase of the APFN/2H_{2}O system form multilamellar vesicles under shear rate.

== Restrictions ==
In 2020, a California bill was passed banning APFN as an intentionally added ingredient from cosmetics.
