= Micellar cubic =

Lyotropic liquid crystal phase

A micellar cubic phase is a lyotropic liquid crystal phase formed when the concentration of micelles dispersed in a solvent (usually water) is sufficiently high that they are forced to pack into a structure having a long-ranged positional (translational) order. For example, spherical micelles a cubic packing of a body-centered cubic lattice. Normal topology micellar cubic phases, denoted by the symbol I_{1}, are the first lyotropic liquid crystalline phases that are formed by type I amphiphiles. The amphiphiles' hydrocarbon tails are contained on the inside of the micelle and hence the polar-apolar interface of the aggregates has a positive mean curvature, by definition (it curves away from the polar phase). The first pure surfactant system found to exhibit three different type I (oil-in-water) micellar cubic phases was observed in the dodecaoxyethylene mono-n-dodecyl ether (C12EO12)/water system.

Inverse topology micellar cubic phases (such as the Fd3m phase) are observed for some type II amphiphiles at very high amphiphile concentrations. These aggregates, in which water is the minority phase, have a polar-apolar interface with a negative mean curvature. The structures of the normal topology micellar cubic phases that are formed by some types of amphiphiles (e.g. the oligoethyleneoxide monoalkyl ether series of non-ionic surfactants are the subject of debate. Micellar cubic phases are isotropic phases but are distinguished from micellar solutions by their very high viscosity. When thin film samples of micellar cubic phases are viewed under a polarising microscope they appear dark and featureless. Small air bubbles trapped in these preparations tend to appear highly distorted and occasionally have faceted surfaces. A reversed micellar cubic phase has been observed, although it is much less common. It was observed that a reverse micellar cubic phase with Fd3m (Q227) symmetry formed in a ternary system of an amphiphilic diblock copolymer (EO17BO10, where EO represents ethylene oxide and BO represents butylene oxide), water, and p-xylene.

Schematic of the structure of a type I micellar cubic phase showing spherical micelles disposed on a body-centered cubic lattice.
