= Lipid polymorphism =

Ability of lipids to aggregate into a variety of structured phases

Cross Section view of the structures that can be formed by phospholipids in aqueous solutions

In biophysics and colloidal chemistry, polymorphism is the ability of lipids to aggregate in a variety of ways, giving rise to structures of different shapes, known as "phases". This can be in the form of spheres of lipid molecules (micelles), pairs of layers that face one another (lamellar phase, observed in biological systems as a lipid bilayer), a tubular arrangement (hexagonal), or various cubic phases (Fd3̅m, Im3̅m, Ia3̅m, Pn3̅m, and Pm3̅m being those discovered so far). More complicated aggregations have also been observed, such as rhombohedral, tetragonal and orthorhombic phases.

It forms an important part of current academic research in the fields of membrane biophysics (polymorphism), biochemistry (biological impact) and organic chemistry (synthesis).

Determination of the topology of a lipid system is possible by a number of methods, the most reliable of which is x-ray diffraction. This uses a beam of x-rays that are scattered by the sample, giving a diffraction pattern as a set of rings. The ratio of the distances of these rings from the central point indicates which phase(s) are present.

The structural phase of the aggregation is influenced by the ratio of lipids present, temperature, hydration, pressure and ionic strength (and type).

== Hexagonal phases ==
In lipid polymorphism, if the packing ratio of lipids is greater or less than one, lipid membranes can form two separate hexagonal phases, or nonlamellar phases, in which long, tubular aggregates form according to the environment in which the lipid is introduced.

=== Hexagonal I phase (H_{I}) ===
This phase is favored in detergent-in-water solutions and has a packing ratio of less than one. The micellar population in a detergent/water mixture cannot increase without limit as the detergent to water ratio increases. In the presence of low amounts of water, lipids that would normally form micelles will form larger aggregates in the form of micellar tubules in order to satisfy the requirements of the hydrophobic effect. These aggregates can be thought of as micelles that are fused together. These tubes have the polar head groups facing out, and the hydrophobic hydrocarbon chains facing the interior. This phase is only seen under unique, specialized conditions, and most likely is not relevant for biological membranes.

=== Hexagonal II phase (H_{II}) ===
Lipid molecules in the HII phase pack inversely to the packing observed in the hexagonal I phase described above. This phase has the polar head groups on the inside and the hydrophobic, hydrocarbon tails on the outside in solution. The packing ratio for this phase is larger than one, which is synonymous with an inverse cone packing.

Extended arrays of long tubes will form (as in the hexagonal I phase), but because of the way the polar head groups pack, the tubes take the shape of aqueous channels. These arrays can stack together like pipes. This way of packing may leave a finite hydrophobic surface in contact with water on the outside of the array. However, the otherwise energetically favorable packing apparently stabilizes this phase as a whole. It is also possible that an outer monolayer of lipid coats the surface of the collection of tubes to protect the hydrophobic surface from interaction with the aqueous phase.

It is suggested that this phase is formed by lipids in solution in order to compensate for the hydrophobic effect. The tight packing of the lipid head groups reduces their contact with the aqueous phase. This, in turn, reduces the amount of ordered, but unbound water molecules. The most common lipids that form this phase include phosphatidylethanolamine (PE), when it has unsaturated hydrocarbon chains. Diphosphatidylglycerol (DPG, otherwise known as cardiolipin) in the presence of calcium is also capable of forming this phase.

=== Techniques for detection ===
There are several techniques used to map out which phase is present during perturbations done on the lipid. These perturbations include pH changes, temperature changes, pressure changes, volume changes, etc.

The most common technique used to study phospholipid phase presence is phosphorus nuclear magnetic resonance (31P NMR). In this technique, different and unique powder diffraction patterns are observed for lamellar, hexagonal, and isotropic phases. Other techniques that are used and do offer definitive evidence of existence of lamellar and hexagonal phases include freeze-fracture electron microscopy, X-ray diffraction, differential scanning calorimetry (DSC), and deuterium nuclear magnetic resonance (2H NMR).

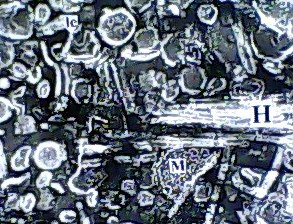
Inverted hexagonal H-II phase (H), inverted spherical micellar phase (M), lamellar liposomal phase (le) structures in cold-exposed aqueous dispersions of total lipid extract of spinach thylakoid membranes, studied by negative staining (2% phosphotungstic acid) transmission electron microscopy.

Additionally, negative staining transmission electron microscopy has been shown as a useful tool to study lipid bilayer phase behavior and polymorphism into lamellar phase, micellar, unilamellar liposome, and hexagonal aqueous-lipid structures, in aqueous dispersions of membrane lipids. As water-soluble negative stain is excluded from the hydrophobic part (fatty acyl chains) of lipid aggregates, the hydrophilic headgroup portions of the lipid aggregates stain dark and clearly mark the outlines of the lipid aggregates (see figure).

== See also ==
- Amphiphile
- Critical micelle concentration
- Lipid
- Lipid bilayer phase behavior
- Lyotropic liquid crystal
- Membrane lipids
- Negative staining
