= Supermicelle =

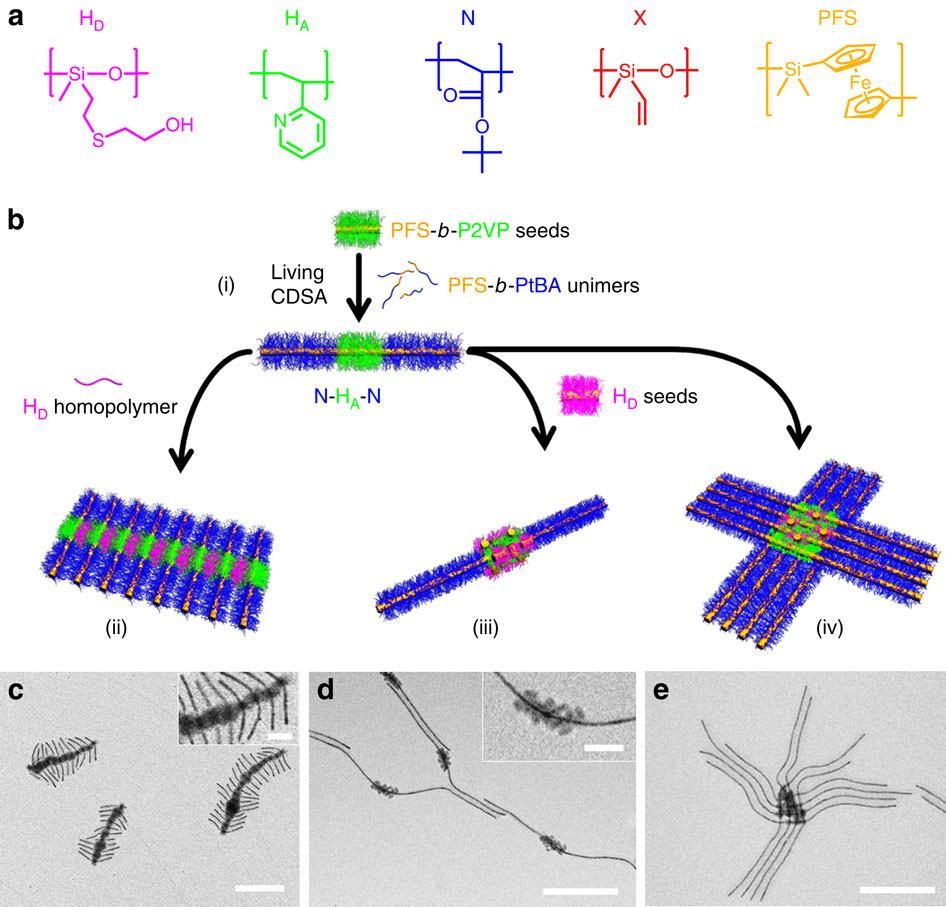
Formation of supermicelles from various block copolymers: a hydroxyl-functionalized polymethylvinylsiloxane (H_{D}), an H-bonding acceptor block poly(2-vinylpyridine) (H_{A}), a non-interactive block poly(tert-butyl acrylate (N), and a crosslinkable block poly(methylvinylsiloxane) (X). Polyferrocenyldimethylsilane (PFS) is used as the supermicelle core. Bottom row shows electron microscopy images recorded after evaporation of the solvent, scale bars are 500 nm (100 nm in the insets).

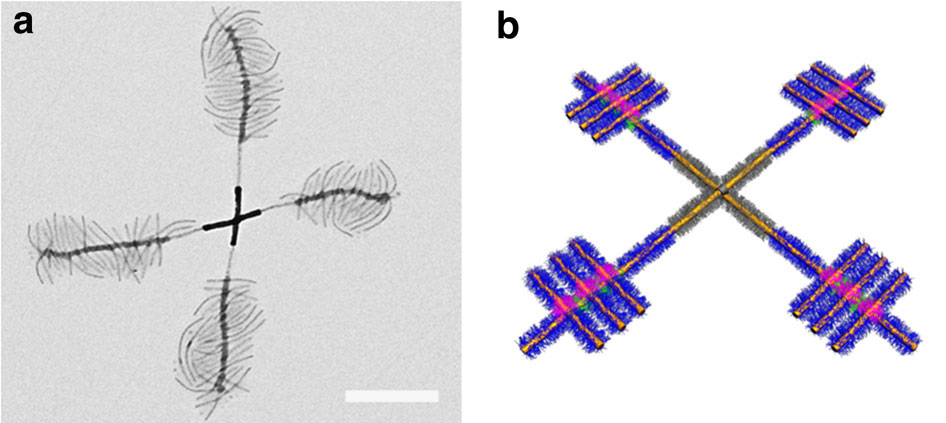
Electron micrograph of a windmill-like supermicelle, scale bar 500 nm.

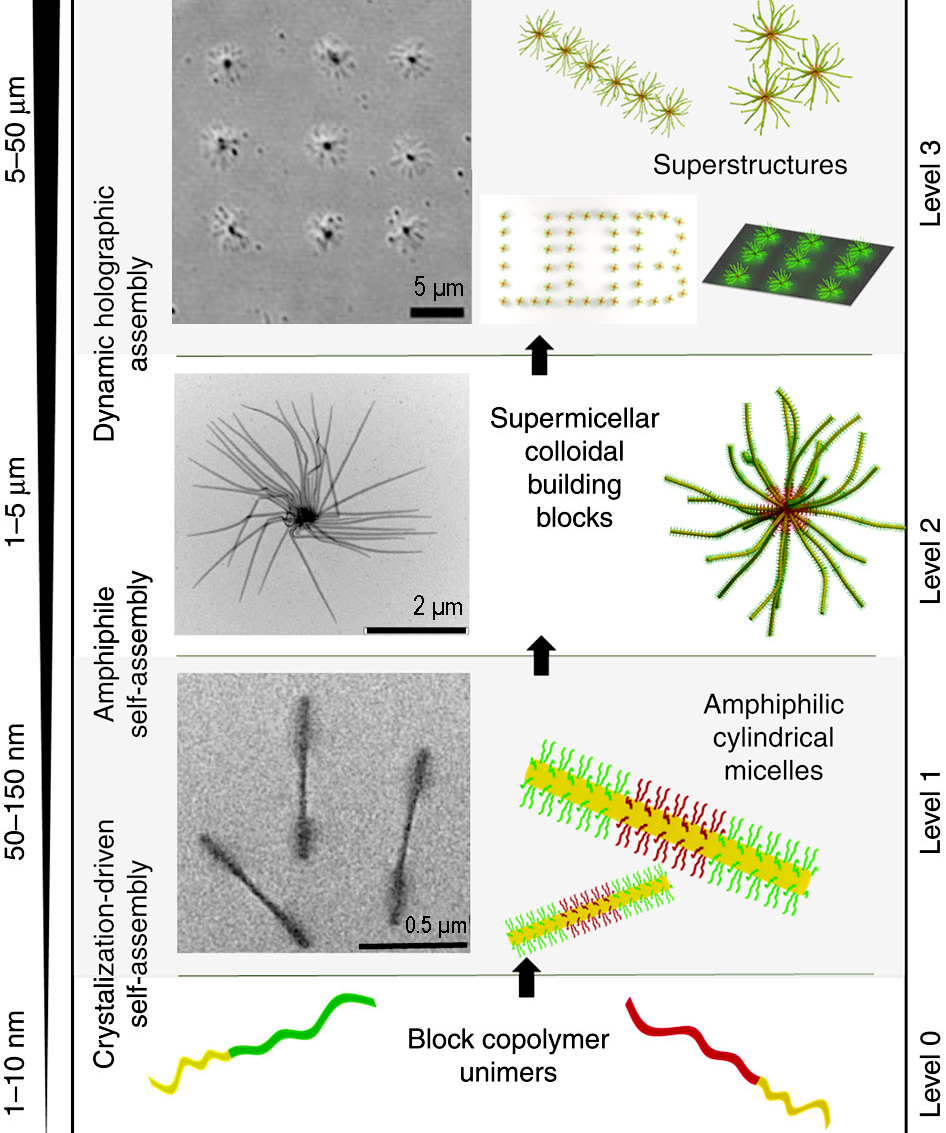
Level 1: Block copolymer unimers form amphiphilic triblock cylindrical micelles. Level 2: The cylindrical micelles form supermicelles via self-assembly around PFS cores. Level 3: The supermicelles are arranged in a pre-designed pattern using holography (optical tweezers). Left: microscopy, right: models.

Supermicelle is a hierarchical micelle structure (supramolecular assembly) where individual components are also micelles. Supermicelles are formed via bottom-up chemical approaches, such as self-assembly of long cylindrical micelles into radial cross-, star- or dandelion-like patterns in a specially selected solvent; solid nanoparticles may be added to the solution to act as nucleation centers and form the central core of the supermicelle. The stems of the primary cylindrical micelles are composed of various block copolymers connected by strong covalent bonds; within the supermicelle structure they are loosely held together by hydrogen bonds, electrostatic or solvophobic interactions.
