= Garnier =

French cosmetics brand

- Type: Subsidiary
- Industry: Cosmetics; Personal care
- Genre: Cosmetics
- Founded: 1904; 122 years ago, in France (as Laboratoires Garnier)
- Founder: Alfred Amour Garnier
- Headquarters: Centre Eugène Schueller; 41 Rue Martre; Clichy, Hauts-de-Seine, France
- Area served: Worldwide (more than 120 countries)
- Products: Hair care Skin care Cosmetics
- Services: Skin care Hair care Hair color
- Parent: L'Oréal
- Divisions: Consumer Products
- Website: garnier.fr garnierusa.com (US website)

Garnier (French pronunciation: [ɡaʁnje]) is a mass market cosmetics brand owned by the French company L'Oréal. Garnier is specialised in hair care and skin care products.

== Launch ==
Laboratoires Garnier was founded in France in 1904 by Alfred Amour Garnier. The company's first product was patented as the first hair lotion derived from natural plant ingredients. The company then introduced sun-care products in 1936, followed by permanent home hair color in 1960.

== Expansion and products ==
Over the decades, Garnier expanded from hair care and hair color into skin care since its acquisition by L'Oréal in 1970. In the 2000s, Garnier launched a line of hair color products, including permanent and semi-permanent dyes.

In 2013, Garnier introduced Olia, an ammonia-free hair color line, made with a 60% oil blend with natural flower oils.

A staple of the French market for years, Garnier debuted its micellar line in the US in 2016.

In 2018, Garnier introduced a skin care line with 96% naturally derived ingredients, adapted to all skin types.

Garnier launched a line of products aimed at black skin in Brazil in 2021. The line was co-created by the brand with Brazilian singer Iza and is especially aimed at darker skin tones.

== Transition to Cruelty Free status ==
On 5 March 2021, Cruelty Free International announced that Garnier had been approved as Cruelty Free under the Leaping Bunny programme.

Many, but not necessarily all, of Garnier's products are also labelled as 'Vegan'. Garnier is still part of the L'Oreal group, which although claims not to test on animals, has not received Cruelty Free status on account of having an active market in China, where animal testing is a legal requirement for cosmetic products.

== Donations ==
In 2025, Garnier — previously a platinum sponsor of New York City's Heritage of Pride annual Pride Week — scaled back its commitment.
