= Lipid bilayer phase behavior =

Ability of lipid molecules to move within a bilayer relative to temperature

In colloidal chemistry, one property of a lipid bilayer is the relative mobility (fluidity) of the individual lipid molecules and how this mobility changes with temperature. This response is known as the phase behavior of the bilayer. Broadly, at a given temperature a lipid bilayer can exist in either a liquid or a solid phase. The solid phase is commonly referred to as a “gel” phase. All lipids have a characteristic temperature at which they undergo a transition (melt) from the gel to liquid phase. In both phases the lipid molecules are constrained to the two dimensional plane of the membrane, but in liquid phase bilayers the molecules diffuse freely within this plane. Thus, in a liquid bilayer a given lipid will rapidly exchange locations with its neighbor millions of times a second and will, through the process of a random walk, migrate over long distances.

== Motion constraints ==
In contrast to this large in-plane mobility, it is very difficult for lipid molecules to flip-flop from one side of the lipid bilayer to the other. In a phosphatidylcholine-based bilayer this process typically occurs over a timescale of weeks. This discrepancy can be understood in terms of the basic structure of the bilayer. For a lipid to flip from one leaflet to the other, its hydrated headgroup must cross the hydrophobic core of the bilayer, an energetically unfavorable process. Unlike liquid phase bilayers, the lipids in a gel phase bilayer are locked in place and exhibit neither flip-flop nor lateral mobility. Due to this limited mobility, gel bilayers lack an important property of liquid bilayers: the ability to reseal small holes. Liquid phase bilayers can spontaneously heal small voids, much the same way a film of oil on water could flow in to fill a gap. This functionality is one of the reasons that cell membranes are usually composed of fluid phase bilayers. Motion constraints on lipids in lipid bilayers are also imposed by presence of proteins in biological membranes, especially so in the annular lipid shell 'attached' to surface of integral membrane proteins.

== Physical origins ==
Diagram showing the effect of unsaturated lipids on a bilayer. The lipids with an unsaturated tail (blue) disrupt the packing of those with only saturated tails (black). The resulting bilayer has more free space and is consequently more permeable to water and other small molecules.

The phase behavior of lipid bilayers is largely determined by the strength of the attractive Van der Waals interactions between adjacent lipid molecules. The extent of this interaction is in turn governed by how long the lipid tails are and how well they can pack together. Longer tailed lipids have more area over which to interact, increasing the strength of this interaction and consequently decreasing the lipid mobility. Thus, at a given temperature, a short-tailed lipid will be more fluid than an otherwise identical long-tailed lipid. Another way of expressing this would be to say that the gel to liquid phase transition temperature increases with increasing number of carbons in the lipid alkane chains. Saturated phosphatidylcholine lipids with tails longer than 14 carbons are solid at room temperature, while those with fewer than 14 are liquid. This phenomenon is analogous to the fact that paraffin wax, which is composed of long alkanes, is solid at room temperature, while octane (gasoline), a short alkane, is liquid.

Aside from chain length, transition temperature can also be affected by the degree of unsaturation of the lipid tails. An unsaturated double bond can produce a kink in the alkane chain, disrupting the regular periodic structure. This disruption creates extra free space within the bilayer which allows additional flexibility in the adjacent chains. It is this disruption of packing that leads to lower transition temperatures with increasing double bonds. This is a particularly powerful effect; decreasing the overall chain length by one carbon usually alters the transition temperature of a lipid by ten degrees Celsius or less, but adding a single double bond can decrease the transition temperature by fifty degrees or more (see table). An example of this effect can be noted in everyday life as butter, which has a large percentage saturated fats, is solid at room temperature while vegetable oil, which is mostly unsaturated, is liquid.

Transition temperature (in °C) as a function of tail length and saturation. All data are for lipids with PC headgroups and two identical tails.
Tail Length	Double Bonds	Transition Temperature
12	0	-1
14	0	23
16	0	41
18	0	55
20	0	66
22	0	75
24	0	80
18	1	1
18	2	-53
18	3	-60

== Mixed systems ==
Bilayers need not be composed of a single type of lipid and, in fact, most natural membranes are a complex mixture of different lipid molecules. Such mixtures often exhibit properties intermediate to their components, but are also capable of a phenomenon not seen in single component systems: phase separation. If some of the components are liquid at a given temperature while others are in the gel phase, the two phases can coexist in spatially separated populations. This phase separation plays a critical role in biochemical phenomena because membrane components such as proteins can partition into one or the other phase and thus be locally concentrated or activated.

== Cholesterol ==
The chemical structure of cholesterol, which differs greatly from a standard phospholipid.

The presence of cholesterol exerts a profound but complicated influence on lipid bilayer properties because of its unique physical characteristics. Although it is a lipid, cholesterol bears little resemblance to a phospholipid. The hydrophilic domain of cholesterol is quite small, consisting of a single hydroxyl group. Adjacent to this hydroxyl group is a rigid planar structure composed of several fused rings. At the opposite end of the ring structure is a short single chain tail. It has been known for decades that the addition of cholesterol to a fluid phase bilayer decreases its permeability to water. The mode of this interaction has more recently been shown to be due to cholesterol intercalating between lipid molecules, filling in free space and decreasing the flexibility of surrounding lipid chains. This interaction also increases the mechanical rigidity of fluid membrane lipid bilayers and decreases their lateral diffusion coefficient. In contrast, the addition of cholesterol to gel phase bilayers disrupts local packing order, increasing the diffusion coefficient and decreasing the elastic modulus. Interactions of cholesterol with multi-component systems are even more complicated, as these can result in intricate phase diagrams. One lipid-cholesterol system that has recently been studied intently is the lipid raft. Lipid rafts are cholesterol-enriched gel domains that have been potentially implicated in certain cell signaling processes, but the subject remains controversial, with some researchers doubting even their existence in vivo.

== Lipid polymorphism ==
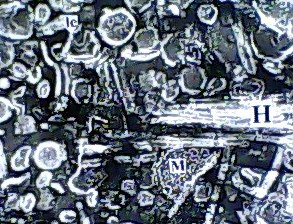
Example of lipid polymorphism as bilayer (le), reverse spherical micelles (M) and reverse hexagonal cylinders H-II phase (H) in negatively stained transmission electron micrograph of spinach thylakoid lipid-water dispersions.

Mixed lipid liposomes can undergo changes into different phase dispersion structures, called lipid polymorphisms, for example, spherical micelles, lipid bilayer lamellae and hexagonal phase cylinders, depending on physical and chemical changes in their microenvironment. Phase transition temperature of liposomes and biological membranes can be measured using calorimetry, magnetic resonance spectroscopy and other techniques.

== See also ==
- Annular lipid shell
- Hexagonal phase
- Lipid bilayer
- Lipid polymorphism
- Lipidomics
- Liposome
- Membrane fluidity
- Membrane lipids
