= Unilamellar liposome =

A unilamellar liposome is a spherical liposome, a vesicle, bounded by a single bilayer of an amphiphilic lipid or a mixture of such lipids, containing aqueous solution inside the chamber. Unilamellar liposomes are used to study biological systems and to mimic cell membranes, and are classified into three groups based on their size: small unilamellar liposomes/vesicles (SUVs) that with a size range of 20–100 nm, large unilamellar liposomes/vesicles (LUVs) with a size range of 100–1000 nm and giant unilamellar liposomes/vesicles (GUVs) with a size range of 1–200 μm. GUVs are mostly used as models for biological membranes in research work. Animal cells are 10–30 μm and plant cells are typically 10–100 μm. Even smaller cell organelles such as mitochondria are typically 1–2 μm. Therefore, a proper model should account for the size of the specimen being studied. In addition, the size of vesicles dictates their membrane curvature which is an important factor in studying fusion proteins. SUVs have a higher membrane curvature and vesicles with high membrane curvature can promote membrane fusion faster than vesicles with lower membrane curvature such as GUVs.

The composition and characteristics of the cell membrane varies in different cells (plant cells, mammalian cells, bacterial cells, etc). In a membrane bilayer, often the composition of the phospholipids is different between the inner and outer leaflets. Phosphatidylcholine, phosphatidylethanolamine, phosphatidylserine, phosphatidylinositol, and sphingomyelin are some of the most common lipids most animal cell membranes. These lipids are widely different in charge, length, and saturation state. The presence of unsaturated bonds (double bonds) in lipids for example, creates a kink in acyl chains which further changes the lipid packing and results in a looser packing. Therefore, the composition and sizes of the unilamellar liposomes must be chosen carefully based on the subject of the study.

Each lipid bilayer structure is comparable to lamellar phase lipid organization in biological membranes, in general. In contrast, multilamellar liposomes (MLVs), consist of many concentric amphiphilic lipid bilayers analogous to onion layers, and MLVs may be of variable sizes up to several micrometers.

== Preparation ==
=== Small unilamellar vesicles and large unilamellar vesicles ===
There are several methods to prepare unilamellar liposomes and the protocols differ based on the type of desired unilamellar vesicles. Different lipids can be bought either dissolved in chloroform or as lyophilized lipids. In the case of lyophilized lipids, they can be solubilized in chloroform. Lipids are then mixed with a desired molar ratio. Then chloroform is evaporated using a gentle stream of nitrogen (to avoid oxygen contact and oxidation of lipids) at room temperature. A rotary evaporator can be used to form a homogeneous layer of liposomes. This step removes the bulk of chloroform. To remove the residues of trapped chloroform, lipids are placed under vacuum from several hours to overnight. Next step is re-hydration where the dried lipids are re-suspended in the desired buffer. Lipids can be vortexed for several minutes to insure that all the lipid residues get re-suspended. SUVs can be obtained in via two methods. Either by sonication (for instance with 1 second pulses in 3 Hz cycles at a power of 150 W) or by extrusion. In extrusion method, the lipid mixture is passed through a membrane for 10 or more times. Depending on the size of the membrane, either SUVs or LUVs can be obtained. Keeping vesicles under argon and away from oxygen and light can extend their lifetime.

=== Giant unilamellar vesicles ===
Natural swelling: in this method soluble lipids in chloroform are pipetted on a Teflon ring. The chloroform is allowed to evaporate and the ring is then placed under the vacuum for several hours. Next the aqueous buffer is added gently over the Teflon ring and lipids are allowed to naturally swell to form GUVs overnight. The disadvantage of this method is that a large amount of multilamellar vesicles and lipid debris are formed.

Electroformation: In this method lipids are placed on a conductive cover glass (indium tin oxide or ITO coated glass) or on Pt wires instead of a Teflon ring and after vacuuming, buffer is placed on the dried lipids and it is sandwiched using a second conductive cover glass. Next an electrical field with certain frequency and voltage is applied which promotes formation of GUVs. For polyunsaturated lipids, this technique can induce a significant oxidation effect on the vesicles. Nevertheless, it is a very common and reliable technique to generate GUVs. Modified approaches exist that employ gel-assisted swelling (agarose-assisted swelling or PVA-assisted swelling) for the formation of GUVs under more biologically relevant conditions.

A variety of methods exist to encapsulate biological reactants within GUVs by using water-oil interfaces as a scaffold to assemble lipid layers. This allows the use of GUVs as cell-like membrane containers for the in vitro recreation (and investigation) of biological functions. These encapsulation methods include microfluidic methods, which allow for a high-yield production of vesicles with consistent sizes.

== Applications ==
Phospholipid liposomes are used as targeted drug delivery systems. Hydrophilic drugs can be carried as solution inside the SUVs or MLVs and hydrophobic drugs can be incorporated into lipid bilayer of these liposomes. If injected into circulation of human/animal body, MLVs are preferentially taken up phagocytic cells, and thus drugs can be targeted to these cells. For general or overall delivery, SUVs may be used. For topical applications on skin, specialized lipids like phospholipids and sphingolipids may be used to make drug-free liposomes as moisturizers, and with drugs such as for anti-ultraviolet radiation applications.

In biomedical research, unilamellar liposomes are extremely useful to study biological systems and mimicking cell functions. As a living cell is very complicated to study, unilamellar liposomes provide a simple tool to study membrane interaction events such as membrane fusion, protein localization in the plasma membrane, study ion channels, etc.

== See also ==
- Lipid polymorphism
- Liposome
- Lipid bilayer
