= Tactoid =

Liquid crystal transition state

Tactoids are liquid crystal microdomains nucleated in isotropic phases, which can be distinguished as spherical or spindle-shaped birefringent microdroplets under polarized light microscopy. Tactoids are a transition state between isotropic and macroscopic liquid crystalline phases. The first observation of tactoids was made by Zocher in 1925, when he studied the nematic phase formed in vanadium pentoxide sols. After that, tactoids have been found in the phase transition processes in many lyotropic liquid crystalline substances, such as tobacco mosaic virus, polypeptides, and cellulose nanocrystals.

== In biology ==
It has been shown that filamin causes actin to condense into tactoids. The filamentous phage Pf4 generates a tactoid shell around host P. aeruginosa cells that confer antibiotic resistance.
