= Lyotropic liquid crystal =

Solution of amphiphilic molecules which has both fluid and crystalline properties

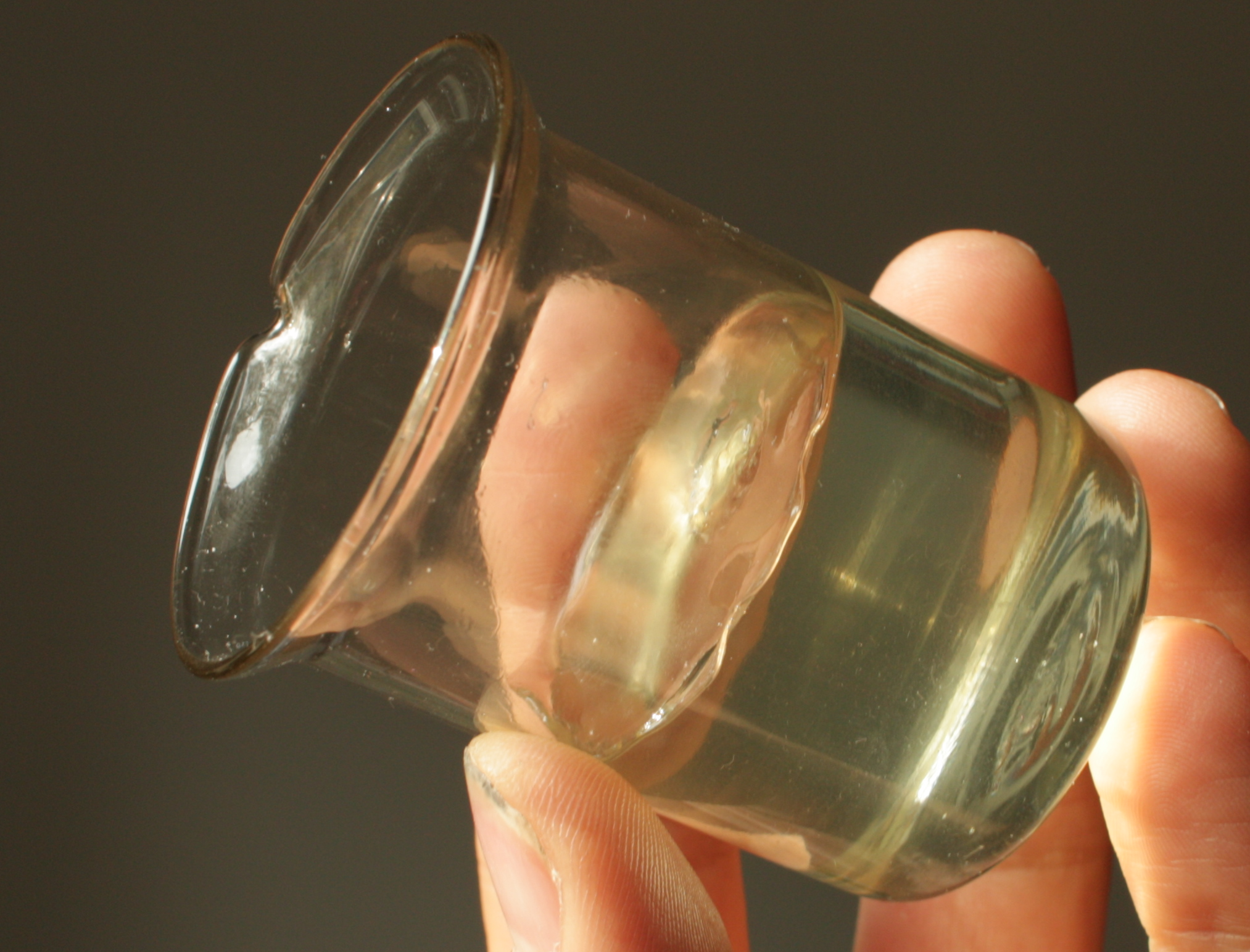
A highly viscous cubic phase gel made of polysorbate 80, water, and liquid paraffin.

Lyotropic liquid crystals result when amphiphiles, which are both hydrophobic and hydrophilic, dissolve into a solution that behaves both like a liquid and a solid crystal. This liquid crystalline mesophase includes everyday mixtures like soap and water.

The term lyotropic comes from Ancient Greek λύω (lúō) 'to dissolve' and τροπικός (tropikós) 'change'. Historically, the term was used to describe the common behavior of materials composed of amphiphilic molecules upon the addition of a solvent. Such molecules comprise a hydrophilic (literally 'water-loving') head-group (which may be ionic or non-ionic) attached to a hydrophobic ('water-hating') group.

The micro-phase segregation of two incompatible components on a nanometer scale results in different types of solvent-induced extended anisotropic arrangement, depending on the volume balances between the hydrophilic part and hydrophobic part. In turn, they generate the long-range order of the phases, with the solvent molecules filling the space around the compounds to provide fluidity to the system.

In contrast to thermotropic liquid crystals, lyotropic liquid crystals have therefore an additional degree of freedom, that is the concentration that enables them to induce a variety of different phases. As the concentration of amphiphilic molecules is increased, several different type of lyotropic liquid crystal structures occur in solution. Each of these different types has a different extent of molecular ordering within the solvent matrix, from spherical micelles to larger cylinders, aligned cylinders and even bilayered and multiwalled aggregates.

== Types ==
Examples of amphiphilic compounds are the salts of fatty acids, phospholipids. Many simple amphiphiles are used as detergents. A mixture of soap and water is an everyday example of a lyotropic liquid crystal.

Biological structures such as fibrous proteins showings relatively long and well-defined hydrophobic and hydrophilic ‘‘blocks’’ of aminoacids can also show lyotropic liquid crystalline behaviour.

== Amphiphile self-assembly ==
A typical amphiphilic flexible surfactant can form aggregates through a self-assembly process that results of specific interactions between the molecules of the amphiphilic mesogen and those of the non-mesogenic solvent.

In aqueous media, the driving force of the aggregation is the "hydrophobic effect". The aggregates formed by amphiphilic molecules are characterised by structures in which the hydrophilic head-groups expose their surface to aqueous solution, shielding the hydrophobic chains from contact with water.

For most lyotropic systems aggregation occurs only when the concentration of the amphiphile exceeds a critical concentration (known variously as the critical micelle concentration (CMC) or the critical aggregation concentration (CAC)).

At very low amphiphile concentration, the molecules will be dispersed randomly without any ordering. At slightly higher (but still low) concentration, above the CMC, self-assembled amphiphile aggregates exist as independent entities in equilibrium with monomeric amphiphiles in solution, but with no long ranged orientational or positional (translational) order. As a result, phases are isotropic (i.e. not liquid crystalline). These dispersions are generally referred to as 'micellar solutions', often denoted by the symbol L_{1}, while the constituent spherical aggregates are known as 'micelles'.

At higher concentration, the assemblies will become ordered. True lyotropic liquid crystalline phases are formed as the concentration of amphiphile in water is increased beyond the point where the micellar aggregates are forced to be disposed regularly in space. For amphiphiles that consist of a single hydrocarbon chain the concentration at which the first liquid crystalline phases are formed is typically in the range 25–30 wt%.

== Phases and composition/temperature ==
The simplest liquid crystalline phase that is formed by spherical micelles is the 'micellar cubic', denoted by the symbol I_{1}. This is a highly viscous, optically isotropic phase in which the micelles are arranged on a cubic lattice. Prior to becoming macroscopic liquid crystals, tactoids are formed, which are liquid crystal microdomains in an isotrophic phase. At higher amphiphile concentrations the micelles fuse to form cylindrical aggregates of indefinite length, and these cylinders are arranged on a long-ranged hexagonal lattice. This lyotropic liquid crystalline phase is known as the 'hexagonal phase', or more specifically the 'normal topology' hexagonal phase and is generally denoted by the symbol H_{I}.

At higher concentrations of amphiphile the 'lamellar phase' is formed. This phase is denoted by the symbol L_{α} and can be considered the lyotropic equivalent of a smectic A mesophase. This phase consists of amphiphilic molecules arranged in bilayer sheets separated by layers of water. Each bilayer is a prototype of the arrangement of lipids in cell membranes.

For most amphiphiles that consist of a single hydrocarbon chain, one or more phases having complex architectures are formed at concentrations that are intermediate between those required to form a hexagonal phase and those that lead to the formation of a lamellar phase. Often this intermediate phase is a bicontinuous cubic phase.

Schematic showing the aggregation of amphiphiles into micelles and then into lyotropic liquid crystalline phases as a function of amphiphile concentration and of temperature.

Increasing the amphiphile concentration beyond the point where lamellar phases are formed would lead to the formation of the inverse topology lyotropic phases, namely the inverse cubic phases, the inverse hexagonal columnar phase (columns of water encapsulated by amphiphiles, (H_{II}) and the inverse micellar cubic phase (a bulk liquid crystal sample with spherical water cavities). In practice inverse topology phases are more readily formed by amphiphiles that have at least two hydrocarbon chains attached to a headgroup. The most abundant phospholipids that are found in cell membranes of mammalian cells are examples of amphiphiles that readily form inverse topology lyotropic phases.

Even within the same phases, self-assembled structures are tunable by the concentration: For example, in lamellar phases, the layer distances increase with the solvent volume. Since lyotropic liquid crystals rely on a subtle balance of intermolecular interactions, it is more difficult to analyze their structures and properties than those of thermotropic liquid crystals.

The objects created by the amphiphiles are usually spherical (as in the case of micelles), but may also be disc-like (bicelles), rod-like, or biaxial (all three micelle axes are distinct). These anisotropic self-assembled nano-structures can then order themselves in much the same way as thermotropic liquid crystals do, forming large-scale versions of all the thermotropic phases (such as a nematic phase of rod-shaped micelles).

== Host molecules ==
It is possible that specific molecules are dissolved in lyotropic mesophases, where they can be located mainly inside, outside, or at the surface of the aggregates.

Some of such molecules act as dopants, inducing specific properties to the whole phase, other ones can be considered simple guests with limited effect on the surrounding environment but possibly strong consequences on their physico-chemical properties, and some of them are used as probe to detect molecular-level properties of the whole mesophase in specific analytical techniques.

=== Rod-like macromolecules ===
The term lyotropic has also been applied to the liquid crystalline phases that are formed by certain polymeric materials, particularly those consisting of rigid rod-like macromolecules, when they are mixed with appropriate solvents. Examples are suspensions of rod-like viruses such as the tobacco mosaic virus as well as synthetic macromolecules, such as Li_{2}Mo_{6}Se_{6} nanowire or colloidal suspensions of non-spherical colloidal particles. Cellulose and cellulose derivatives form lyotropic liquid crystal phases as do nanocrystalline (nanocellulose) suspensions. Other examples include DNA and Kevlar, which dissolve in sulfuric acid to give a lyotropic phase. It is noted that in these cases the solvent acts to lower the melting point of the materials thereby enabling the liquid crystalline phases to be accessible. These liquid crystalline phases are closer in architecture to thermotropic liquid crystalline phases than to the conventional lyotropic phases. In contrast to the behaviour of amphiphilic molecules, the lyotropic behaviour of the rod-like molecules does not involve self-assembly.

=== Disk-like macromolecules/nanosheets ===
Examples of lyotropic liquid crystals can also be generated using 2D nanosheets. The most striking example of a true nematic phase has been demonstrated for many smectite clays. The issue of the existence of such a lyotropic phase was raised by Langmuir in 1938, but remained an open question for a very long time and was only confirmed recently. With the rapid development of nanosciences, and the synthesis of many new anisotropic 2D nanoparticles, the number of such Nematic mesophase based on 2D nanosheet has increased quickly, with, for example graphene oxide colloidal suspensions. Noteworthy, a lamellar phase was even discovered, H_{3}Sb_{3}P_{2}O_{14}, which exhibits hyperswelling up to ~250 nm for the interlamellar distance.

== Applications ==
Scientists at the Korea Institute of Science and Technology (KIST) used Lyotropic Liquid Crystal-Assisted Surface Texturing (LAST) to develop a conductive carbon nanotube (CNT) wire that uses no metal. The resulting flexible core-sheath composite electric cables (CSCEC) conduct electricity and far lighter than conventional cables. Each wire includes a ~256-μm conductor core with a 10-μm sheath. It has been used to replace all the copper in a prototype electric motor.
