= Lamellar phase =

Layer packing of chain molecules with polar and nonpolar ends in a bulk liquid

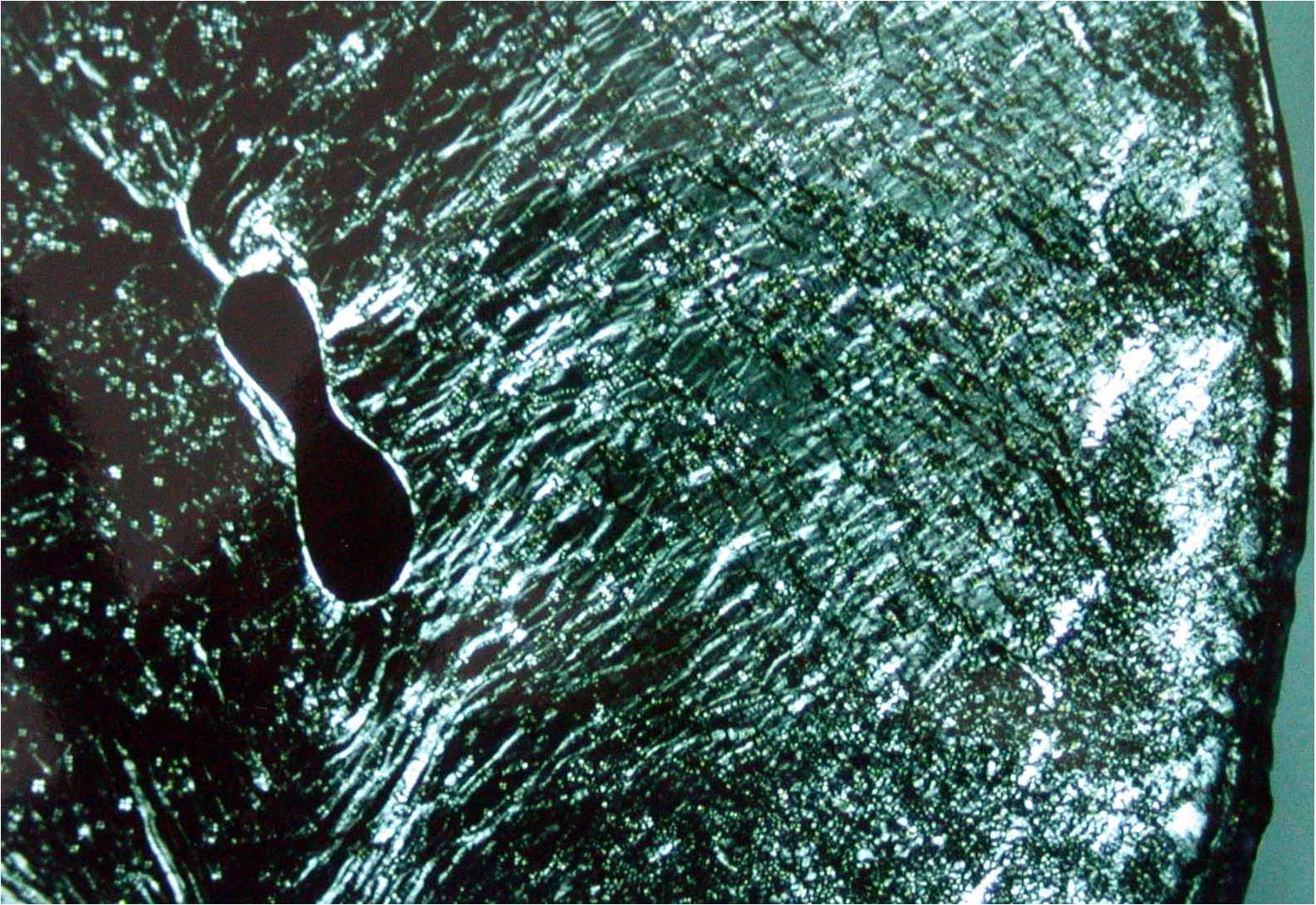
Texture of lamellar phase

Lamellar phase refers generally to packing of polar-headed, long chain, nonpolar-tailed molecules (amphiphiles) in an environment of bulk polar liquid, as sheets of bilayers separated by bulk liquid. In biophysics, polar lipids (mostly, phospholipids, and rarely, glycolipids) pack as a liquid crystalline bilayer, with hydrophobic fatty acyl long chains directed inwardly and polar headgroups of lipids aligned on the outside in contact with water, as a 2-dimensional flat sheet surface. Under transmission electron microscopy (TEM), after staining with polar headgroup reactive chemical osmium tetroxide, lamellar lipid phase appears as two thin parallel dark staining lines/sheets, constituted by aligned polar headgroups of lipids. 'Sandwiched' between these two parallel lines, there exists one thicker line/sheet of non-staining closely packed layer of long lipid fatty acyl chains. This TEM-appearance became famous as Robertson's unit membrane - the basis of all biological membranes, and structure of lipid bilayer in unilamellar liposomes. In multilamellar liposomes, many such lipid bilayer sheets are layered concentrically with water layers in between.

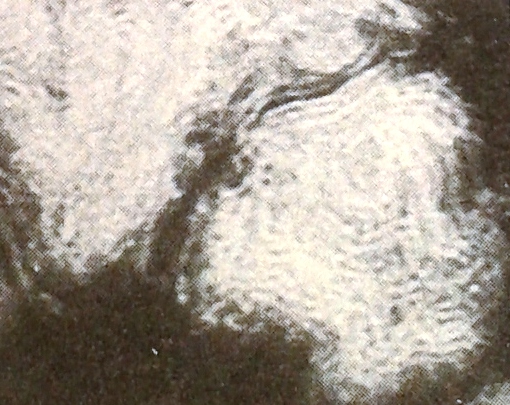
Multi-lamellar phase of aqueous lipid dispersions, each white lamella represents a lipid bilayer organization in liposome made by vortex-mixing of dried total lipid extract of spinach thylakoid membranes with distilled water. Phosphotungstic acid negative stained sample viewed with transmission electron microscopy technique.

In lamellar lipid bilayers, polar headgroups of lipids align together at the interface of water and hydrophobic fatty-acid acyl chains align parallel to one another 'hiding away' from water. The lipid head groups are somewhat more 'tightly' packed than relatively 'fluid' hydrocarbon fatty acyl long chains. The lamellar lipid bilayer organization, thus reveals a 'flexibility gradient' of increasing freedom of motions from near the head-groups towards the terminal fatty-acyl chain methyl groups. Existence of such a dynamic organization of lamellar phase in liposomes as well as biological membranes can be confirmed by spin label electron paramagnetic resonance and high resolution nuclear magnetic resonance spectroscopy studies of biological membranes and liposomes.

In 'soft matter science', where physics and chemistry meet biological science, a bilayer lamellar phase has been recently created from fluorinated silica, and it has been projected for use as a shear-thinning lubricant.

== See also ==
- History of cell membrane theory
- Lipid polymorphism
- Lipid bilayer
- Micelle
- Unilamellar liposome
