= Lipid bilayer =

Biological membrane structure

This fluid lipid bilayer cross section is made up entirely of phosphatidylcholine.

The three main structures phospholipids form in solution; the liposome (a closed bilayer), the micelle and the bilayer.

The lipid bilayer (or phospholipid bilayer) is a thin polar membrane made of two layers of lipid molecules. These membranes form a continuous barrier around all cells. The cell membranes of almost all organisms and many viruses are made of a lipid bilayer, as are the nuclear membrane surrounding the cell nucleus, and membranes of the membrane-bound organelles in the cell. The lipid bilayer is the barrier that keeps ions, proteins and other molecules where they are needed and prevents them from diffusing into areas where they should not be. Lipid bilayers are ideally suited to this role, even though they are only a few nanometers in width, because they are impermeable to most water-soluble (hydrophilic) molecules. Bilayers are particularly impermeable to ions, which allows cells to regulate salt concentrations and pH by transporting ions across their membranes using proteins called ion pumps.

Biological bilayers are usually composed of amphiphilic phospholipids that have a hydrophilic phosphate head and a hydrophobic tail consisting of two fatty acid chains. Phospholipids with certain head groups can alter the surface chemistry of a bilayer and can, for example, serve as signals as well as "anchors" for other molecules in the membranes of cells. Just like the heads, the tails of lipids can also affect membrane properties, for instance by determining the phase of the bilayer. The bilayer can adopt a solid gel phase state at lower temperatures but undergo phase transition to a fluid state at higher temperatures, and the chemical properties of the lipids' tails influence at which temperature this happens. The packing of lipids within the bilayer also affects its mechanical properties, including its resistance to stretching and bending. Many of these properties have been studied with the use of artificial "model" bilayers produced in a lab. Vesicles made by model bilayers have also been used clinically to deliver drugs.

The structure of biological membranes typically includes several types of molecules in addition to the phospholipids comprising the bilayer. A particularly important example in animal cells is cholesterol, which helps strengthen the bilayer and decrease its permeability. Cholesterol also helps regulate the activity of certain integral membrane proteins. Integral membrane proteins function when incorporated into a lipid bilayer, and they are held tightly to the lipid bilayer with the help of an annular lipid shell. Because bilayers define the boundaries of the cell and its compartments, these membrane proteins are involved in many intra- and inter-cellular signaling processes. Certain kinds of membrane proteins are involved in the process of fusing two bilayers together. This fusion allows the joining of two distinct structures as in the acrosome reaction during fertilization of an egg by a sperm, or the entry of a virus into a cell. Because lipid bilayers are fragile and invisible in a traditional microscope, they are difficult to study. Experiments on bilayers often require advanced techniques like electron microscopy and atomic force microscopy.

== Structure and organization ==
When phospholipids are exposed to water, they self-assemble into a two-layered sheet with the hydrophobic tails pointing toward the center of the sheet. This arrangement results in two 'leaflets' that are each a single molecular layer. The center of this bilayer contains almost no water and excludes molecules like sugars or salts that dissolve in water. The assembly process and maintenance are driven by aggregation of hydrophobic molecules (also called the hydrophobic effect). This complex process includes non-covalent interactions such as van der Waals forces, electrostatic and hydrogen bonds.

=== Cross-section analysis ===
Schematic cross sectional profile of a typical lipid bilayer. There are three distinct regions: the fully hydrated headgroups, the fully dehydrated alkane core and a short intermediate region with partial hydration. Although the head groups are neutral, they have significant dipole moments that influence the molecular arrangement.

The lipid bilayer is very thin compared to its lateral dimensions. If a typical mammalian cell (diameter ~10 micrometers) were magnified to the size of a watermelon (~1 ft/30 cm), the lipid bilayer making up the plasma membrane would be about as thick as a piece of office paper. Despite being only a few nanometers thick, the bilayer is composed of several distinct chemical regions across its cross-section. These regions and their interactions with the surrounding water have been characterized over the past several decades with x-ray reflectometry, neutron scattering, and nuclear magnetic resonance techniques.

The first region on either side of the bilayer is the hydrophilic headgroup. This portion of the membrane is completely hydrated and is typically around 0.8-0.9 nm thick. In phospholipid bilayers the phosphate group is located within this hydrated region, approximately 0.5 nm outside the hydrophobic core. In some cases, the hydrated region can extend much further, for instance in lipids with a large protein or long sugar chain grafted to the head. One common example of such a modification in nature is the lipopolysaccharide coat on a bacterial outer membrane.

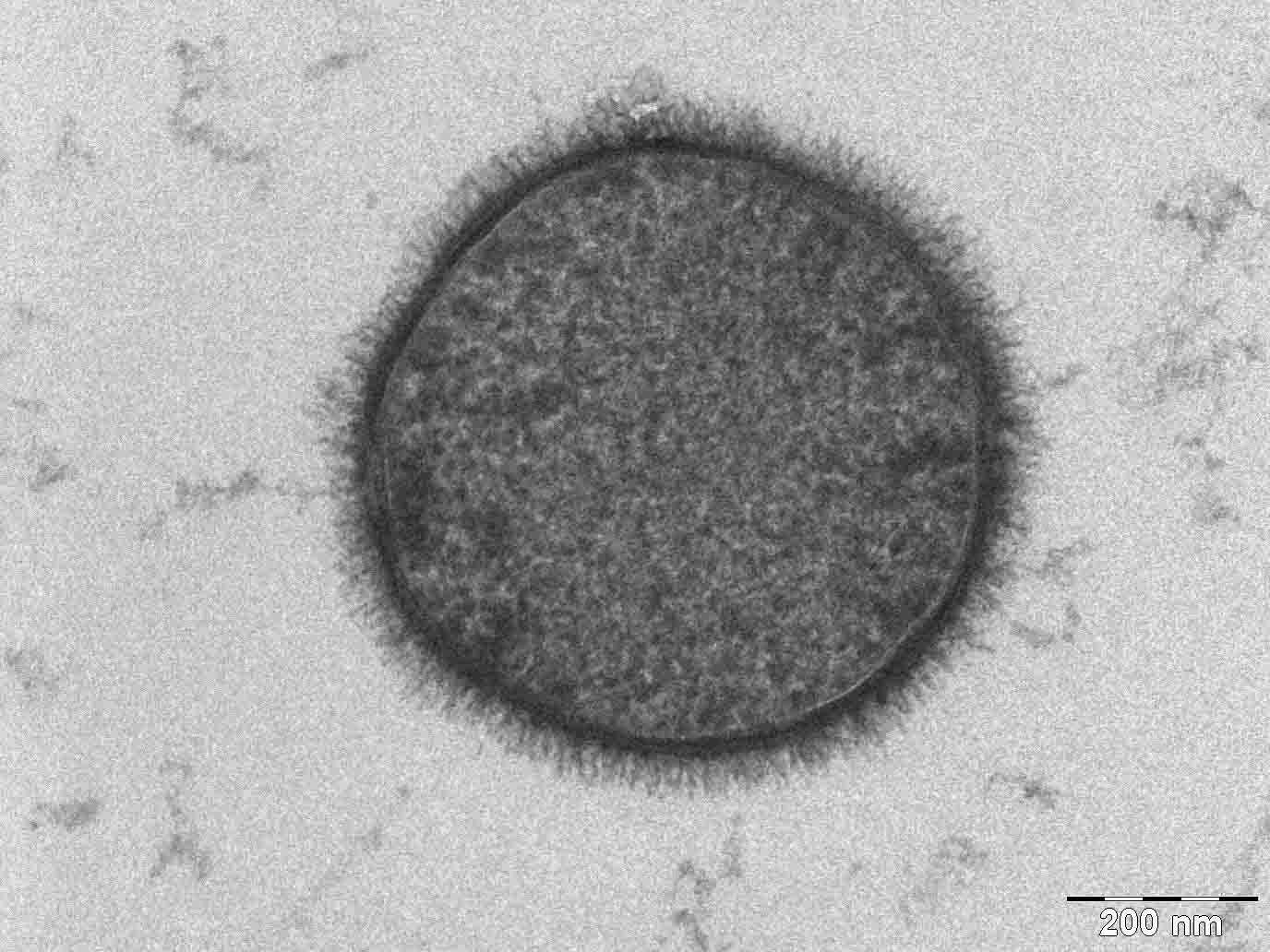
TEM image of a bacterium. The furry appearance on the outside is due to a coat of long-chain sugars attached to the cell membrane. This coating helps trap water to prevent the bacterium from becoming dehydrated.

Next to the hydrophilic headgroup region is an intermediate region that is only partially hydrated. This boundary layer is approximately 0.3 nm thick. Within this short distance, the water concentration drops from 2M on the headgroup side to nearly zero on the tail (core) side. The hydrophobic core of the bilayer is typically 3-4 nm thick, but this value varies with chain length and chemistry. Core thickness also varies significantly with temperature, in particular near a phase transition.

=== Asymmetry ===
In many naturally occurring bilayers, the compositions of the inner and outer membrane leaflets are different. In human red blood cells, the inner (cytoplasmic) leaflet is composed mostly of phosphatidylethanolamine, phosphatidylserine and phosphatidylinositol and its phosphorylated derivatives. By contrast, the outer (extracellular) leaflet is based on phosphatidylcholine, sphingomyelin and a variety of glycolipids. In some cases, this asymmetry is based on where the lipids are made in the cell and reflects their initial orientation. The biological functions of lipid asymmetry are imperfectly understood, although it is clear that it is used in several different situations. For example, when a cell undergoes apoptosis, the phosphatidylserine – normally localised to the cytoplasmic leaflet – is transferred to the outer surface: There, it is recognised by a macrophage that then actively scavenges the dying cell.

Lipid asymmetry arises, at least in part, from the fact that most phospholipids are synthesised and initially inserted into the inner monolayer: those that constitute the outer monolayer are then transported from the inner monolayer by a class of enzymes called flippases. Other lipids, such as sphingomyelin, appear to be synthesised at the external leaflet. Flippases are members of a larger family of lipid transport molecules that also includes floppases, which transfer lipids in the opposite direction, and scramblases, which randomize lipid distribution across lipid bilayers (as in apoptotic cells). In any case, once lipid asymmetry is established, it does not normally dissipate quickly because spontaneous flip-flop of lipids between leaflets is extremely slow. It has recently been shown that cholesterol also seems to play an important role in creating and maintaining bilayer asymmetry.

It is possible to mimic this asymmetry in the laboratory in model bilayer systems. Certain types of very small artificial vesicle will automatically make themselves slightly asymmetric, although the mechanism by which this asymmetry is generated is very different from that in cells. By utilizing two different monolayers in Langmuir–Blodgett deposition or a combination of Langmuir–Blodgett and vesicle rupture deposition it is also possible to synthesize an asymmetric planar bilayer. This asymmetry may be lost over time as lipids in supported bilayers can be prone to flip-flop. However, it has been reported that lipid flip-flop is slow compared to cholesterol and other smaller molecules.

It has been reported that the organization and dynamics of the lipid monolayers in a bilayer are coupled. For example, introduction of obstructions in one monolayer can slow down the lateral diffusion in both monolayers. In addition, phase separation in one monolayer can also induce phase separation in other monolayer even when other monolayer can not phase separate by itself.

=== Phases and phase transitions ===
Diagram showing the effect of unsaturated lipids on a bilayer. The lipids with an unsaturated tail (blue) disrupt the packing of those with only saturated tails (black). The resulting bilayer has more free space and is, as a consequence, more permeable to water and other small molecules.

At a given temperature a lipid bilayer can exist in either a liquid or a gel (solid) phase. All lipids have a characteristic temperature at which they transition (melt) from the gel to liquid phase. In both phases the lipid molecules are prevented from flip-flopping across the bilayer, but in liquid phase bilayers a given lipid will exchange locations with its neighbor millions of times a second. This random walk exchange allows lipid to diffuse and thus wander across the surface of the membrane.Unlike liquid phase bilayers, the lipids in a gel phase bilayer have less mobility.

The phase behavior of lipid bilayers is determined largely by the strength of the attractive Van der Waals interactions between adjacent lipid molecules. Longer-tailed lipids have more area over which to interact, increasing the strength of this interaction and, as a consequence, decreasing the lipid mobility. Thus, at a given temperature, a short-tailed lipid will be more fluid than an otherwise identical long-tailed lipid. Transition temperature can also be affected by the degree of unsaturation of the lipid tails. An unsaturated double bond can produce a kink in the alkane chain, disrupting the lipid packing. This disruption creates extra free space within the bilayer that allows additional flexibility in the adjacent chains. An example of this effect can be noted in everyday life as butter, which has a large percentage of saturated fats, is solid at room temperature while vegetable oil, which is mostly unsaturated, is liquid.

Most natural membranes are a complex mixture of different lipid molecules. If some of the components are liquid at a given temperature while others are in the gel phase, the two phases can coexist in spatially separated regions, rather like an iceberg floating in the ocean. This phase separation plays a critical role in biochemical phenomena because membrane components such as proteins can partition into one or the other phase and thus be locally concentrated or activated. One particularly important component of many mixed phase systems is cholesterol, which modulates bilayer permeability, mechanical strength, and biochemical interactions.

=== Surface chemistry ===
While lipid tails primarily modulate bilayer phase behavior, it is the headgroup that determines the bilayer surface chemistry. Most natural bilayers are composed primarily of phospholipids, but sphingolipids and sterols such as cholesterol are also important components. Of the phospholipids, the most common headgroup is phosphatidylcholine (PC), accounting for about half the phospholipids in most mammalian cells. PC is a zwitterionic headgroup, as it has a negative charge on the phosphate group and a positive charge on the amine but, because these local charges balance, no net charge.

Other headgroups are also present to varying degrees and can include phosphatidylserine (PS) phosphatidylethanolamine (PE) and phosphatidylglycerol (PG). These alternate headgroups often confer specific biological functionality that is highly context-dependent. For instance, PS presence on the extracellular membrane face of erythrocytes is a marker of cell apoptosis, whereas PS in growth plate vesicles is necessary for the nucleation of hydroxyapatite crystals and subsequent bone mineralization. Unlike PC, some of the other headgroups carry a net charge, which can alter the electrostatic interactions of small molecules with the bilayer.

== Biological roles ==
=== Containment and separation ===
The primary role of the lipid bilayer in biology is to separate aqueous compartments from their surroundings. Without some form of barrier delineating "self" from "non-self", it is difficult to even define the concept of an organism or of life. This barrier takes the form of a lipid bilayer in all known life forms except for a few species of archaea that utilize a specially adapted lipid monolayer. It has even been proposed that the very first form of life may have been a simple lipid vesicle with virtually its sole biosynthetic capability being the production of more phospholipids. The partitioning ability of the lipid bilayer is based on the fact that hydrophilic molecules cannot easily cross the hydrophobic bilayer core, as discussed in Transport across the bilayer below. The nucleus, mitochondria and chloroplasts have two lipid bilayers, while other sub-cellular structures are surrounded by a single lipid bilayer (such as the plasma membrane, endoplasmic reticula, Golgi apparatus and lysosomes). See Organelle.

Prokaryotes have only one lipid bilayer - the cell membrane (also known as the plasma membrane). Many prokaryotes also have a cell wall, but the cell wall is composed of proteins or long chain carbohydrates, not lipids. In contrast, eukaryotes have a range of organelles including the nucleus, mitochondria, lysosomes and endoplasmic reticulum. All of these sub-cellular compartments are surrounded by one or more lipid bilayers and, together, typically comprise the majority of the bilayer area present in the cell. In liver hepatocytes for example, the plasma membrane accounts for only two percent of the total bilayer area of the cell, whereas the endoplasmic reticulum contains more than fifty percent and the mitochondria a further thirty percent.

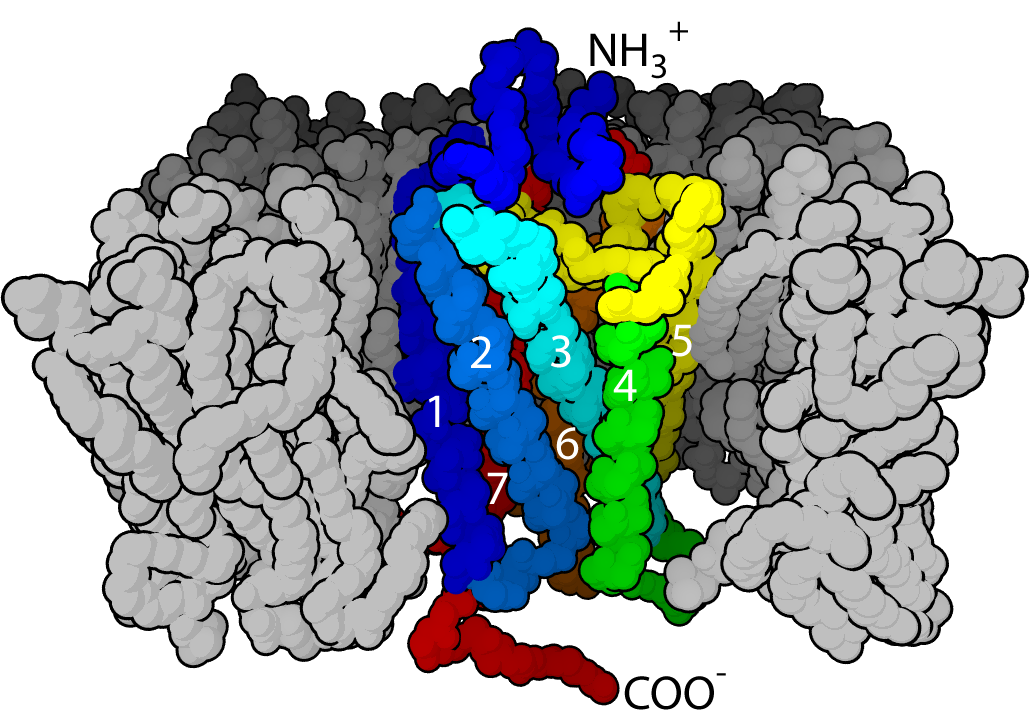
Illustration of a GPCR signaling protein. In response to a molecule such as a hormone binding to the exterior domain (blue) the GPCR changes shape and catalyzes a chemical reaction on the interior domain (red). The gray feature is the surrounding bilayer.

=== Signaling ===
The most familiar form of cellular signaling is likely synaptic transmission, whereby a nerve impulse that has reached the end of one neuron is conveyed to an adjacent neuron via the release of neurotransmitters. This transmission is made possible by the action of synaptic vesicles which are, inside the cell, loaded with the neurotransmitters to be released later. These loaded vesicles fuse with the cell membrane at the pre-synaptic terminal and their contents are released into the space outside the cell. The contents then diffuse across the synapse to the post-synaptic terminal.

Lipid bilayers are also involved in signal transduction through their role as the home of integral membrane proteins. This is an extremely broad and important class of biomolecule. It is estimated that up to a third of the human proteome are membrane proteins. Some of these proteins are linked to the exterior of the cell membrane. An example of this is the CD59 protein, which identifies cells as "self" and thus inhibits their destruction by the immune system. The HIV virus evades the immune system in part by grafting these proteins from the host membrane onto its own surface. Alternatively, some membrane proteins penetrate all the way through the bilayer and serve to relay individual signal events from the outside to the inside of the cell. The most common class of this type of protein is the G protein-coupled receptor (GPCR). GPCRs are responsible for much of the cell's ability to sense its surroundings and, because of this important role, approximately 40% of all modern drugs are targeted at GPCRs.

In addition to protein- and solution-mediated processes, it is also possible for lipid bilayers to participate directly in signaling. A classic example of this is phosphatidylserine-triggered phagocytosis. Normally, phosphatidylserine is asymmetrically distributed in the cell membrane and is present only on the interior side. During programmed cell death a protein called a scramblase equilibrates this distribution, displaying phosphatidylserine on the extracellular bilayer face. The presence of phosphatidylserine then triggers phagocytosis to remove the dead or dying cell.

== Characterization methods ==
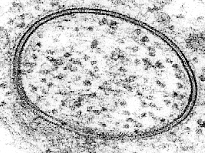
Transmission Electron Microscope (TEM) image of a lipid vesicle. The two dark bands around the edge are the two leaflets of the bilayer. Historically, similar images confirmed that the cell membrane is a bilayer

The lipid bilayer is a difficult structure to study because it is so thin and fragile. To overcome these limitations, techniques have been developed to allow investigations of its structure and function.

=== Electrical measurements ===
Electrical measurements are a straightforward way to characterize an important function of a bilayer: its ability to segregate and prevent the flow of ions in solution. By applying a voltage across the bilayer and measuring the resulting current, the resistance of the bilayer is determined. This resistance is typically quite high (10^{8} Ohm-cm^{2} or more) since the hydrophobic core is impermeable to charged species. The presence of even a few nanometer-scale holes results in a dramatic increase in current. The sensitivity of this system is such that even the activity of single ion channels can be resolved.

=== Fluorescence microscopy ===
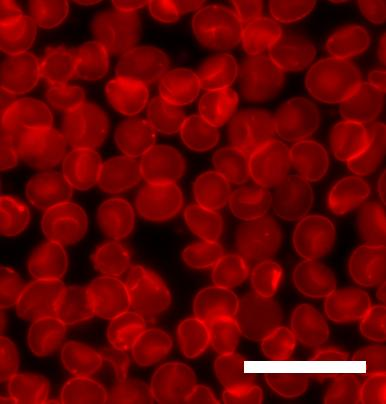
Human red blood cells viewed through a fluorescence microscope. The cell membrane has been stained with a fluorescent dye. Scale bar is 20 μm.

A lipid bilayer cannot be seen with a traditional microscope because it is too thin, so researchers often use fluorescence microscopy. A sample is excited with one wavelength of light and observed in another, so that only fluorescent molecules with a matching excitation and emission profile will be seen. A natural lipid bilayer is not fluorescent, so at least one fluorescent dye needs to be attached to some of the molecules in the bilayer. Resolution is usually limited to a few hundred nanometers, which is unfortunately much larger than the thickness of a lipid bilayer.

=== Electron microscopy ===
Electron microscopy offers a higher resolution image. In an electron microscope, a beam of focused electrons interacts with the sample rather than a beam of light as in traditional microscopy. In conjunction with rapid freezing techniques, electron microscopy has also been used to study the mechanisms of inter- and intracellular transport, for instance in demonstrating that exocytotic vesicles are the means of chemical release at synapses.

=== Nuclear magnetic resonance spectroscopy ===
^{31}P-Nuclear magnetic resonance spectroscopy is widely used for studies of phospholipid bilayers and biological membranes in native conditions. The analysis of ^{31}P-NMR spectra of lipids could provide a wide range of information about lipid bilayer packing, phase transitions (gel phase, physiological liquid crystal phase, ripple phases, non bilayer phases), lipid head group orientation/dynamics, and elastic properties of pure lipid bilayer and as a result of binding of proteins and other biomolecules.

=== Atomic force microscopy ===
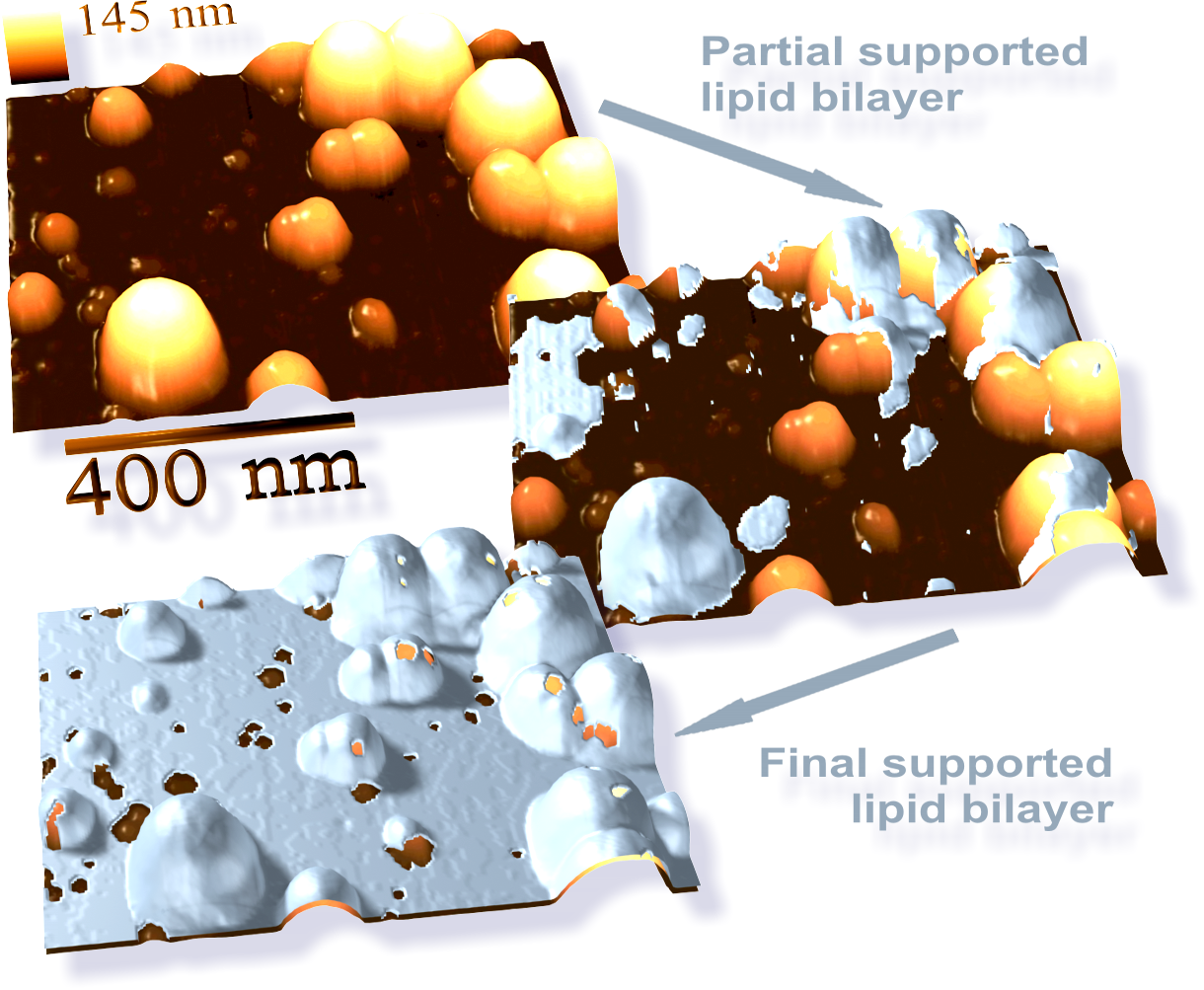
3d-Adapted AFM images showing formation of transmembrane pores (holes) in supported lipid bilayer

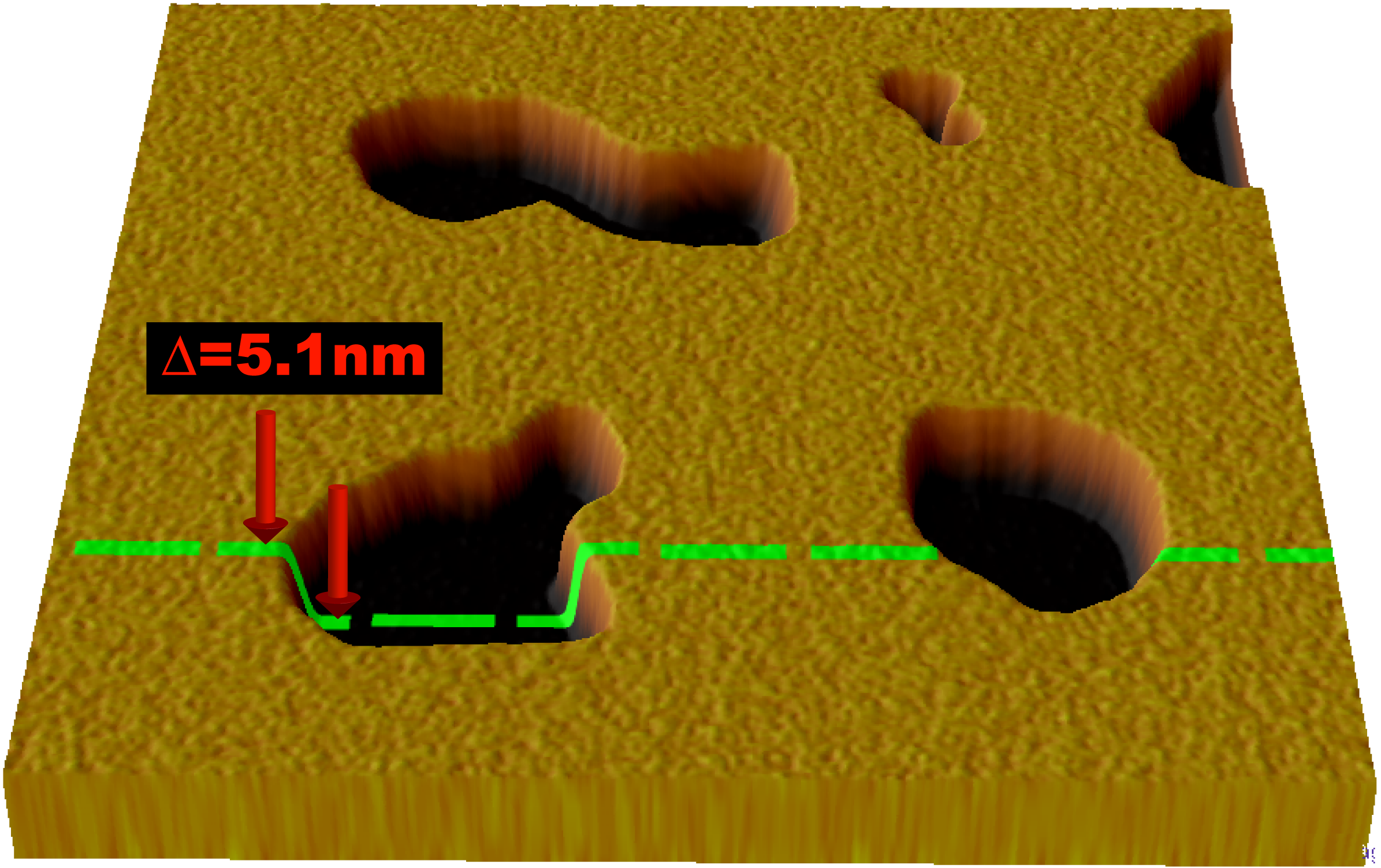
Illustration of a typical AFM scan of a supported lipid bilayer. The pits are defects in the bilayer, exposing the smooth surface of the substrate underneath.

A new method to study lipid bilayers is Atomic force microscopy (AFM). Rather than using a beam of light or particles, a very small sharpened tip scans the surface by making physical contact with the bilayer and moving across it, like a record player needle. AFM is a promising technique because it has the potential to image with nanometer resolution at room temperature and even under water or physiological buffer, conditions necessary for natural bilayer behavior. Utilizing this capability, AFM has been used to examine dynamic bilayer behavior including the formation of transmembrane pores (holes) and phase transitions in supported bilayers. Another advantage is that AFM does not require fluorescent or isotopic labeling of the lipids, since the probe tip interacts mechanically with the bilayer surface. Because of this, the same scan can image both lipids and associated proteins, sometimes even with single-molecule resolution. AFM can also probe the mechanical nature of lipid bilayers.

=== Dual polarisation interferometry ===
Lipid bilayers exhibit high levels of birefringence where the refractive index in the plane of the bilayer differs from that perpendicular by as much as 0.1 refractive index units. This has been used to characterise the degree of order and disruption in bilayers using dual polarisation interferometry to understand mechanisms of protein interaction.

=== Quantum chemical calculations ===
Lipid bilayers are complicated molecular systems with many degrees of freedom. Thus, atomistic simulation of membrane and in particular ab initio calculations of its properties is difficult and computationally expensive. Quantum chemical calculations has recently been successfully performed to estimate dipole and quadrupole moments of lipid membranes.

== Transport across the bilayer ==
=== Passive diffusion ===
Most polar molecules have low solubility in the hydrocarbon core of a lipid bilayer and, as a consequence, have low permeability coefficients across the bilayer. This effect is particularly pronounced for charged species, which have even lower permeability coefficients than neutral polar molecules. Anions typically have a higher rate of diffusion through bilayers than cations. Compared to ions, water molecules actually have a relatively large permeability through the bilayer, as evidenced by osmotic swelling. When a cell or vesicle with a high interior salt concentration is placed in a solution with a low salt concentration it will swell and eventually burst. Such a result would not be observed unless water was able to pass through the bilayer with relative ease. The anomalously large permeability of water through bilayers is still not completely understood and continues to be the subject of active debate. Small uncharged apolar molecules diffuse through lipid bilayers many orders of magnitude faster than ions or water. This applies both to fats and organic solvents like chloroform and ether. Regardless of their polar character larger molecules diffuse more slowly across lipid bilayers than small molecules.

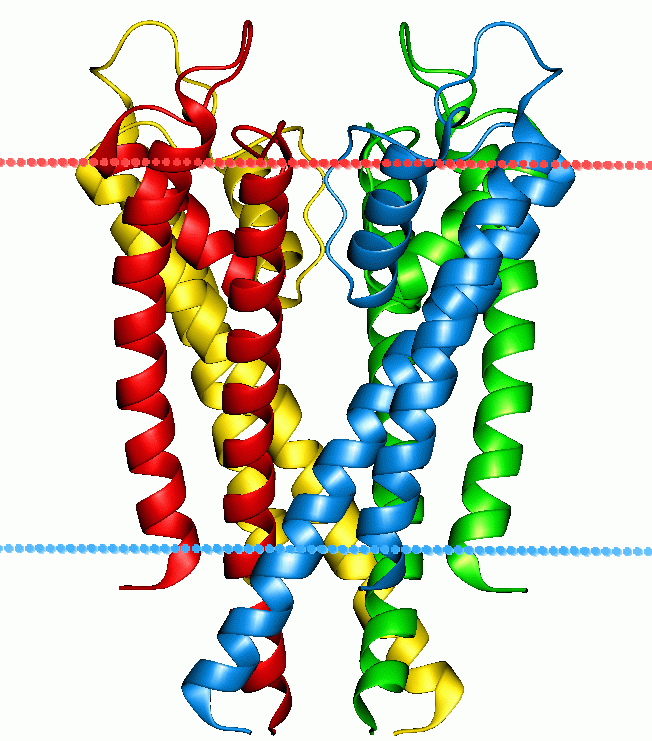
Structure of a potassium ion channel. The alpha helices penetrate the bilayer (between red and blue lines), opening a hole through which potassium ions can flow

=== Ion pumps and channels ===
Two special classes of protein deal with the ionic gradients found across cellular and sub-cellular membranes in nature- ion channels and ion pumps. Both pumps and channels are integral membrane proteins that pass through the bilayer, but their roles are quite different. Ion pumps are the proteins that build and maintain the chemical gradients by utilizing an external energy source to move ions against the concentration gradient to an area of higher chemical potential. The energy source can be ATP, as is the case for the Na^{+}-K^{+} ATPase. Alternatively, the energy source can be another chemical gradient already in place, as in the Ca^{2+}/Na^{+} antiporter. It is through the action of ion pumps that cells are able to regulate pH via the pumping of protons.

In contrast to ion pumps, ion channels do not build chemical gradients but rather dissipate them in order to perform work or send a signal. Probably the most familiar and best studied example is the voltage-gated Na^{+} channel, which allows conduction of an action potential along neurons. All ion pumps have some sort of trigger or "gating" mechanism. In the previous example it was electrical bias, but other channels can be activated by binding a molecular agonist or through a conformational change in another nearby protein.

Schematic illustration of pinocytosis, a type of endocytosis

=== Endocytosis and exocytosis ===
Some molecules or particles are too large or too hydrophilic to pass through a lipid bilayer. Other molecules could pass through the bilayer but must be transported rapidly in such large numbers that channel-type transport is impractical. In both cases, these types of cargo can be moved across the cell membrane through fusion or budding of vesicles. When a vesicle is produced inside the cell and fuses with the plasma membrane to release its contents into the extracellular space, this process is known as exocytosis. In the reverse process, a region of the cell membrane will dimple inwards and eventually pinch off, enclosing a portion of the extracellular fluid to transport it into the cell. Endocytosis and exocytosis rely on very different molecular machinery to function, but the two processes are intimately linked and could not work without each other. The primary mechanism of this interdependence is the large amount of lipid material involved. In a typical cell, an area of bilayer equivalent to the entire plasma membrane travels through the endocytosis/exocytosis cycle in about half an hour.

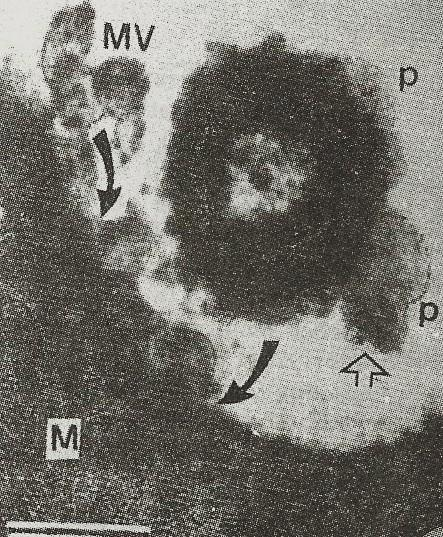
Exocytosis of outer membrane vesicles (MV) liberated from inflated periplasmic pockets (p) on surface of human Salmonella 3,10:r:- pathogens docking on plasma membrane of macrophage cells (M) in chicken ileum, for host-pathogen signaling in vivo.

Exocytosis in prokaryotes: Membrane vesicular exocytosis, popularly known as membrane vesicle trafficking, a Nobel prize-winning (year, 2013) process, is traditionally regarded as a prerogative of eukaryotic cells. This myth was however broken with the revelation that nanovesicles, popularly known as bacterial outer membrane vesicles, released by gram-negative microbes, translocate bacterial signal molecules to host or target cells to carry out multiple processes in favour of the secreting microbe e.g., in host cell invasion and microbe-environment interactions, in general.

=== Electroporation ===
Electroporation is the rapid increase in bilayer permeability induced by the application of a large artificial electric field across the membrane. Experimentally, electroporation is used to introduce hydrophilic molecules into cells. It is a particularly useful technique for large highly charged molecules such as DNA, which would never passively diffuse across the hydrophobic bilayer core. Because of this, electroporation is one of the key methods of transfection as well as bacterial transformation. It has even been proposed that electroporation resulting from lightning strikes could be a mechanism of natural horizontal gene transfer.

== Mechanics ==
Schematic showing two possible conformations of the lipids at the edge of a pore. In the top image the lipids have not rearranged, so the pore wall is hydrophobic. In the bottom image some of the lipid heads have bent over, so the pore wall is hydrophilic.

Lipid bilayers are large enough structures to have some of the mechanical properties of liquids or solids. The area compression modulus K_{a}, bending modulus K_{b}, and edge energy $\Lambda$, can be used to describe them. Solid lipid bilayers also have a shear modulus, but like any liquid, the shear modulus is zero for fluid bilayers. These mechanical properties affect how the membrane functions. K_{a} and K_{b} affect the ability of proteins and small molecules to insert into the bilayer, and bilayer mechanical properties have been shown to alter the function of mechanically activated ion channels. Bilayer mechanical properties also govern what types of stress a cell can withstand without tearing. Although lipid bilayers can easily bend, most cannot stretch more than a few percent before rupturing.

As discussed in the Structure and organization section, the hydrophobic attraction of lipid tails in water is the primary force holding lipid bilayers together. Thus, the elastic modulus of the bilayer is primarily determined by how much extra area is exposed to water when the lipid molecules are stretched apart. It is not surprising given this understanding of the forces involved that studies have shown that K_{a} varies strongly with osmotic pressure but only weakly with tail length and unsaturation. Because the forces involved are so small, it is difficult to experimentally determine K_{a}. Most techniques require sophisticated microscopy and very sensitive measurement equipment.

In contrast to K_{a}, which is a measure of how much energy is needed to stretch the bilayer, K_{b} is a measure of how much energy is needed to bend or flex the bilayer. Formally, bending modulus is defined as the energy required to deform a membrane from its intrinsic curvature to some other curvature. Intrinsic curvature is defined by the ratio of the diameter of the head group to that of the tail group. For two-tailed PC lipids, this ratio is nearly one so the intrinsic curvature is nearly zero. If a particular lipid has too large a deviation from zero intrinsic curvature it will not form a bilayer and will instead form other phases such as micelles or inverted micelles. Addition of small hydrophilic molecules like sucrose into mixed lipid lamellar liposomes made from galactolipid-rich thylakoid membranes destabilises bilayers into the micellar phase.

$\Lambda$ is a measure of how much energy it takes to expose a bilayer edge to water by tearing the bilayer or creating a hole in it. The origin of this energy is the fact that creating such an interface exposes some of the lipid tails to water, but the exact orientation of these border lipids is unknown. There is some evidence that both hydrophobic (tails straight) and hydrophilic (heads curved around) pores can coexist.

== Fusion ==
Illustration of lipid vesicles fusing showing two possible outcomes: hemifusion and full fusion. In hemifusion, only the outer bilayer leaflets mix. In full fusion both leaflets as well as the internal contents mix.

Fusion is the process by which two lipid bilayers merge, resulting in one connected structure. If this fusion proceeds completely through both leaflets of both bilayers, a water-filled bridge is formed and the solutions contained by the bilayers can mix. Alternatively, if only one leaflet from each bilayer is involved in the fusion process, the bilayers are said to be hemifused. Fusion is involved in many cellular processes, in particular in eukaryotes, since the eukaryotic cell is extensively sub-divided by lipid bilayer membranes. Exocytosis, fertilization of an egg by sperm activation, and transport of waste products to the lysosome are a few of the many eukaryotic processes that rely on some form of fusion. Even the entry of pathogens can be governed by fusion, as many bilayer-coated viruses have dedicated fusion proteins to gain entry into the host cell.

There are four fundamental steps in the fusion process. First, the involved membranes must aggregate, approaching each other to within several nanometers. Second, the two bilayers must come into very close contact (within a few angstroms). To achieve this close contact, the two surfaces must become at least partially dehydrated, as the bound surface water normally present causes bilayers to strongly repel. The presence of ions, in particular divalent cations like magnesium and calcium, strongly affects this step. One of the critical roles of calcium in the body is regulating membrane fusion. Third, a destabilization must form at one point between the two bilayers, locally distorting their structures. The exact nature of this distortion is not known. One theory is that a highly curved "stalk" must form between the two bilayers. Proponents of this theory believe that it explains why phosphatidylethanolamine, a highly curved lipid, promotes fusion. Finally, in the last step of fusion, this point defect grows and the components of the two bilayers mix and diffuse away from the site of contact.

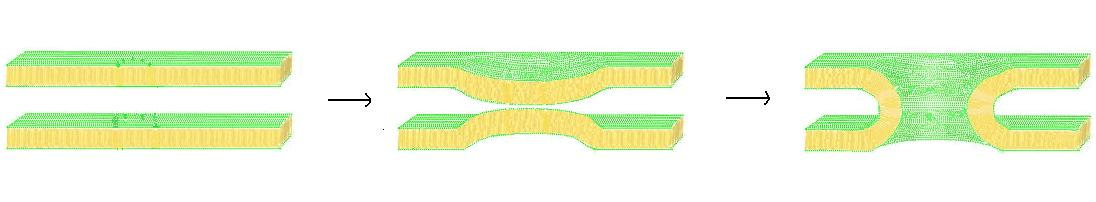
Schematic illustration of the process of fusion through stalk formation

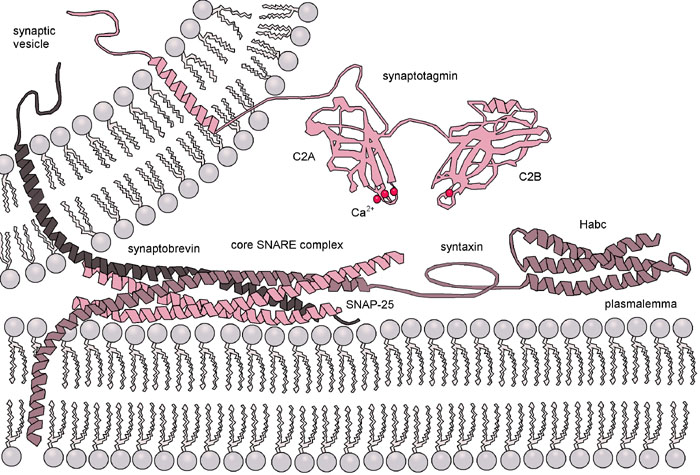
Diagram of the action of SNARE proteins docking a vesicle for exocytosis. Complementary versions of the protein on the vesicle and the target membrane bind and wrap around each other, drawing the two bilayers close together in the process.

The situation is further complicated when considering fusion in vivo since biological fusion is almost always regulated by the action of membrane-associated proteins. The first of these proteins to be studied were the viral fusion proteins, which allow an enveloped virus to insert its genetic material into the host cell (enveloped viruses are those surrounded by a lipid bilayer; some others have only a protein coat). Eukaryotic cells also use fusion proteins, the best-studied of which are the SNAREs. SNARE proteins are used to direct all vesicular intracellular trafficking. Despite years of study, much is still unknown about the function of this protein class. In fact, there is still an active debate regarding whether SNAREs are linked to early docking or participate later in the fusion process by facilitating hemifusion.

In studies of molecular and cellular biology it is often desirable to artificially induce fusion. The addition of polyethylene glycol (PEG) causes fusion without significant aggregation or biochemical disruption. This procedure is now used extensively, for example by fusing B-cells with myeloma cells. The resulting "hybridoma" from this combination expresses a desired antibody as determined by the B-cell involved, but is immortalized due to the melanoma component. Fusion can also be artificially induced through electroporation in a process known as electrofusion. It is believed that this phenomenon results from the energetically active edges formed during electroporation, which can act as the local defect point to nucleate stalk growth between two bilayers.

== Model systems ==
Lipid bilayers can be created artificially in the lab to allow researchers to perform experiments that cannot be done with natural bilayers. They can also be used in the field of Synthetic Biology, to define the boundaries of artificial cells. These synthetic systems are called model lipid bilayers. There are many different types of model bilayers, each having experimental advantages and disadvantages. They can be made with either synthetic or natural lipids. Among the most common model systems are:

- Black lipid membranes (BLM)
- Supported lipid bilayers (SLB)
- Vesicles
- Droplet Interface Bilayers (DIBs)

== Commercial applications ==
To date, the most successful commercial application of lipid bilayers has been the use of liposomes for drug delivery, especially for cancer treatment. (Note- the term "liposome" is in essence synonymous with "vesicle" except that vesicle is a general term for the structure whereas liposome refers to only artificial not natural vesicles) The basic idea of liposomal drug delivery is that the drug is encapsulated in solution inside the liposome then injected into the patient. These drug-loaded liposomes travel through the system until they bind at the target site and rupture, releasing the drug. In theory, liposomes should make an ideal drug delivery system since they can isolate nearly any hydrophilic drug, can be grafted with molecules to target specific tissues and can be relatively non-toxic since the body possesses biochemical pathways for degrading lipids.

The first generation of drug delivery liposomes had a simple lipid composition and suffered from several limitations. Circulation in the bloodstream was extremely limited due to both renal clearing and phagocytosis. Refinement of the lipid composition to tune fluidity, surface charge density, and surface hydration resulted in vesicles that adsorb fewer proteins from serum and thus are less readily recognized by the immune system. The most significant advance in this area was the grafting of polyethylene glycol (PEG) onto the liposome surface to produce "stealth" vesicles, which circulate over long times without immune or renal clearing.

The first stealth liposomes were passively targeted at tumor tissues. Because tumors induce rapid and uncontrolled angiogenesis they are especially "leaky" and allow liposomes to exit the bloodstream at a much higher rate than normal tissue would. More recently work has been undertaken to graft antibodies or other molecular markers onto the liposome surface in the hope of actively binding them to a specific cell or tissue type. Some examples of this approach are already in clinical trials.

Another potential application of lipid bilayers is the field of biosensors. Since the lipid bilayer is the barrier between the interior and exterior of the cell, it is also the site of extensive signal transduction. Researchers over the years have tried to harness this potential to develop a bilayer-based device for clinical diagnosis or bioterrorism detection. Progress has been slow in this area and, although a few companies have developed automated lipid-based detection systems, they are still targeted at the research community. These include Biacore (now GE Healthcare Life Sciences), which offers a disposable chip for utilizing lipid bilayers in studies of binding kinetics and Nanion Inc., which has developed an automated patch clamping system.

A supported lipid bilayer (SLB) as described above has achieved commercial success as a screening technique to measure the permeability of drugs. This parallel artificial membrane permeability assay (PAMPA) technique measures the permeability across specifically formulated lipid cocktail(s) found to be highly correlated with Caco-2 cultures, the gastrointestinal tract, blood–brain barrier and skin.

== History ==
By the early twentieth century scientists had come to believe that cells are surrounded by a thin oil-like barrier, but the structural nature of this membrane was not known. Two experiments in 1925 laid the groundwork to fill in this gap. By measuring the capacitance of erythrocyte solutions, Hugo Fricke determined that the cell membrane was 3.3 nm thick.

Although the results of this experiment were accurate, Fricke misinterpreted the data to mean that the cell membrane is a single molecular layer. Prof. Dr. Evert Gorter (1881–1954) and F. Grendel of Leiden University approached the problem from a different perspective, spreading the erythrocyte lipids as a monolayer on a Langmuir–Blodgett trough. When they compared the area of the monolayer to the surface area of the cells, they found a ratio of two to one. Later analyses showed several errors and incorrect assumptions with this experiment but, serendipitously, these errors canceled out and from this flawed data Gorter and Grendel drew the correct conclusion- that the cell membrane is a lipid bilayer.

This theory was confirmed through the use of electron microscopy in the late 1950s. Although he did not publish the first electron microscopy study of lipid bilayers J. David Robertson was the first to assert that the two dark electron-dense bands were the headgroups and associated proteins of two apposed lipid monolayers. In this body of work, Robertson put forward the concept of the "unit membrane." This was the first time the bilayer structure had been universally assigned to all cell membranes as well as organelle membranes.

Around the same time, the development of model membranes confirmed that the lipid bilayer is a stable structure that can exist independent of proteins. By "painting" a solution of lipid in organic solvent across an aperture, Mueller and Rudin were able to create an artificial bilayer and determine that this exhibited lateral fluidity, high electrical resistance and self-healing in response to puncture, all of which are properties of a natural cell membrane. A few years later, Alec Bangham showed that bilayers, in the form of lipid vesicles, could also be formed simply by exposing a dried lipid sample to water. This demonstrated that lipid bilayers form spontaneously via self assembly and do not require a patterned support structure. In 1977, a totally synthetic bilayer membrane was prepared by Kunitake and Okahata, from a single organic compound, didodecyldimethylammonium bromide. This showed that the bilayer membrane was assembled by the intermolecular forces.

== See also ==
- Surfactant
- Membrane biophysics
- Lipid polymorphism
- Lipidomics
