= Negative stain =

In microscopy, negative staining is an established method, often used in diagnostic microscopy, for contrasting a thin specimen with an optically opaque fluid. In this technique, the background is stained, leaving the actual specimen untouched, and thus visible. This contrasts with positive staining, in which the actual specimen is stained.

== Bright field microscopy ==
For bright-field microscopy, negative staining is typically performed using a black ink fluid such as nigrosin and India ink. The specimen, such as a wet bacterial culture spread on a glass slide, is mixed with the negative stain and allowed to dry. When viewed with the microscope the bacterial cells, and perhaps their spores, appear light against the dark surrounding background. An alternative method has been developed using an ordinary waterproof marking pen to deliver the negative stain.

== Transmission electron microscopy ==
In the case of transmission electron microscopy, opaqueness to electrons is related to the atomic number, i.e., the number of protons. Some suitable negative stains include ammonium molybdate, uranyl acetate, uranyl formate, phosphotungstic acid, osmium tetroxide, osmium ferricyanide and auroglucothionate. These have been chosen because they scatter electrons strongly and also adsorb to biological matter well. The structures which can be negatively stained are much smaller than those studied with the light microscope. Here, the method is used to view viruses, bacteria, bacterial flagella, biological membrane structures and proteins or protein aggregates, which all have a low electron-scattering power. Some stains, such as osmium tetroxide and osmium ferricyanide, are very chemically active. As strong oxidants, they cross-link lipids mainly by reacting with unsaturated carbon-carbon bonds, and thereby both fix biological membranes in place in tissue samples and simultaneously stain them.

The choice of negative stain in electron microscopy can be very important. An early study of plant viruses using negatively stained leaf dips from a diseased plant showed only spherical viruses with one stain and only rod-shaped viruses with another. The verified conclusion was that this plant suffered from a mixed infection by two separate viruses. Negative staining at both light microscope and electron microscope level should never be performed with infectious organisms unless stringent safety precautions are followed. Negative staining is usually a very mild preparation method and thus does not reduce the possibility of operator infection.

== Other applications ==
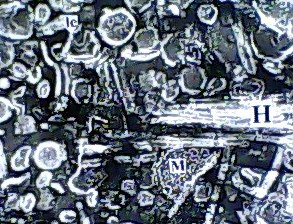
Identification of lamellar(le), reverse-miceller(M) and reverse-hexagonal H-II cylinders(H) lipid phases by negative staining.

Negative staining transmission electron microscopy has also been successfully employed for study and identification of aqueous lipid aggregates like lamellar liposomes (le), inverted spherical micelles (M) and inverted hexagonal HII cylindrical (H) phases (see figure).
