= Micellar solution =

Solution composed of micelles dispersed in a solvent

Schematic of a micellar solution showing spherical micelles distributed in water (solvent) and having no long-range positional order.

In colloidal chemistry, a micellar solution consists of a dispersion of micelles (small particles) in a solvent (most usually water). Micelles are made of molecules that are attracted to both water and oily solvents, known as amphiphiles. Micellar solutions form when the concentration of amphiphile moleculus exceeds the critical micelle concentration (CMC), which is when the tails aggregate inward to minimize contact with water, while the heads face outward, creating spherical or other-shaped micelles.

Although micelles are often depicted as being spherical, they can be cylindrical or oblate depending on the chemical structure of the amphiphile. Because surfactant molecules and micelles are randomly oriented and distributed throughout the solvent, the solution has a homogeneous, transparent appearance. At higher surfactant concentrations or under specific conditions (e.g. temperature), micellar solutions can transition into lyotropic liquid crystalline phases with anisotropic properties, such as hexagonal or lamellar arrangements.

== History ==
Micellar originates from France, with its usage in skincare dating back to 1913. Its popularity boomed internationally when French pharmaceutical company Bioderma released their product Sensibio H_{2}O micellar water in 1991.

== Commercial uses ==
Micellar solutions solubilize hydrophobic substances in their cores and are therefore used in detergents, cosmetics, drug delivery, and analytical chemistry. Micellar water is a dilute micellar solution used in skincare, often to remove makeup and oil from the face. Formulations commonly incorporate non-ionic caprylic/capric glycerides and humectants dispersed in purified water.

Micellar systems are also used to improve the solubility and bioavailability of hydrophobic drugs. They are also applied to stabilize emulsions in food and industrial formulations.
