= Solvophobic =

In physical chemistry, the solvophobic interaction is an interactions between polar solvents and non-polar solutes. In the pure solvent, there are relatively strong cohesive forces between the solvent molecules due to hydrogen bonding or other polar interactions. Hence, non-polar solutes tend not to be soluble in polar solvents because these solvent-solvent binding interactions must be overcome first.

When applied to liquid chromatography (LC), solvophobic theory states that solutes are retained on the stationary phase partly to the rejection of solute molecules by the solvent, and partly to the attraction of the solute molecules by the stationary phase.
