= Bilayer =

Double layer of closely packed atoms or molecules

A bilayer is a double layer of closely packed atoms or molecules.

The properties of bilayers are often studied in condensed matter physics, particularly in the context of semiconductor devices, where two distinct materials are united to form junctions, such as p–n junctions, Schottky junctions, etc. Layered materials, such as graphene, boron nitride, or transition metal dichalcogenides, have unique electronic properties as bilayer systems and are an active area of current research.

In biology, a common example is the lipid bilayer, which describes the structure of multiple organic structures, such as the membrane of a cell.

== See also ==
- Monolayer
- Non-carbon nanotube
- Semiconductor
- Thin film
