= Micelle =

Group of fatty molecules suspended in liquid by soaps and/or detergents

- IUPAC definition
- Micelle: Particle of colloidal dimensions that exists in equilibrium with the molecules or ions in solution from which it is formed.
- Micelle (polymers): Organized auto-assembly formed in a liquid and composed of amphiphilic macromolecules, in general amphiphilic di- or tri-block copolymers made of solvophilic and solvophobic blocks.
- Note 1: An amphiphilic behavior can be observed for water and an organic solvent or between two organic solvents.
- Note 2: Polymeric micelles have a much lower critical micellar concentration (CMC) than soap (0.0001 to 0.001 mol/L) or surfactant micelles, but are nevertheless at equilibrium with isolated macromolecules called unimers. Therefore, micelle formation and stability are concentration-dependent.

Cross-section view of the structures that can be formed by phospholipids in aqueous solutions (unlike this illustration, micelles are usually formed by single-chain lipids, since it is difficult to fit two chains into this shape)

Scheme of a micelle formed by phospholipids in an aqueous solution

A micelle (/maɪˈsɛl/; also spelled micell) or micella (/maɪˈsɛlə/; pl. micelles or micellae, respectively) is an aggregate (or supramolecular assembly) of surfactant amphipathic lipid molecules dispersed in a liquid, forming a colloidal suspension (also known as associated colloidal system). A typical micelle in water forms an aggregate, with the hydrophilic "head" regions in contact with surrounding solvent, sequestering the hydrophobic single-tail regions in the micelle centre.

This phase is caused by the packing behavior of single-tail lipids in a bilayer. The difficulty in filling the volume of the interior of a bilayer, while accommodating the area per head group forced on the molecule by the hydration of the lipid head group, leads to the formation of the micelle. This type of micelle is known as a normal-phase micelle (or oil-in-water micelle). Inverse micelles have the head groups at the centre with the tails extending out (or water-in-oil micelle).

Micelles are approximately spherical in shape. Other shapes, such as ellipsoids, cylinders, and bilayers, are also possible. The shape and size of a micelle are a function of the molecular geometry of its surfactant molecules and solution conditions such as surfactant concentration, temperature, pH, and ionic strength. The process of forming micelles is known as micellisation and forms part of the phase behaviour of many lipids according to their polymorphism.

== History ==
The ability of a soapy solution to act as a detergent has been recognized for centuries. However, it was only at the beginning of the twentieth century that the constitution of such solutions was scientifically studied. Pioneering work in this area was carried out by James William McBain at the University of Bristol. As early as 1913, he postulated the existence of "colloidal ions" to explain the good electrolytic conductivity of sodium palmitate solutions. These highly mobile, spontaneously formed clusters came to be called micelles, a term borrowed from biology and popularized by G.S. Hartley in his classic book Paraffin Chain Salts: A Study in Micelle Formation. The term micelle was coined in nineteenth century scientific literature as the ‑elle diminutive of the Latin word mica (particle), conveying a new word for "tiny particle".

== Solvation ==
Individual surfactant molecules that are in the system but are not part of a micelle are called "monomers". Micelles represent a molecular assembly, in which the individual components are thermodynamically in equilibrium with monomers of the same species in the surrounding medium. In water, the hydrophilic "heads" of surfactant molecules are always in contact with the solvent, regardless of whether the surfactants exist as monomers or as part of a micelle. However, the lipophilic "tails" of surfactant molecules have less contact with water when they are part of a micelle—this being the basis for the energetic drive for micelle formation. In a micelle, the hydrophobic tails of several surfactant molecules assemble into an oil-like core, the most stable form of which having no contact with water. By contrast, surfactant monomers are surrounded by water molecules that create a "cage" or solvation shell connected by hydrogen bonds. This water cage is similar to a clathrate and has an ice-like crystal structure and can be characterized according to the hydrophobic effect. The extent of lipid solubility is determined by the unfavorable entropy contribution due to the ordering of the water structure according to the hydrophobic effect.

Micelles composed of ionic surfactants have an electrostatic attraction to the ions that surround them in solution, the latter known as counterions. Although the closest counterions partially mask a charged micelle (by up to 92%), the effects of micelle charge affect the structure of the surrounding solvent at appreciable distances from the micelle. Ionic micelles influence many properties of the mixture, including its electrical conductivity. Adding salts to a colloid containing micelles can decrease the strength of electrostatic interactions and lead to the formation of larger ionic micelles. This is more accurately seen from the point of view of an effective charge in hydration of the system.

== Energy of formation ==
Micelles form only when the concentration of surfactant is greater than the critical micelle concentration (CMC), and the temperature of the system is greater than the critical micelle temperature, or Krafft temperature. The formation of micelles can be understood using thermodynamics: Micelles can form spontaneously because of a balance between entropy and enthalpy. In water, the hydrophobic effect is the driving force for micelle formation, despite the fact that assembling surfactant molecules is unfavorable in terms of both enthalpy and entropy of the system. At very low concentrations of the surfactant, only monomers are present in solution. As the concentration of the surfactant is increased, a point is reached at which the unfavorable entropy contribution, from clustering the hydrophobic tails of the molecules, is overcome by a gain in entropy due to release of the solvation shells around the surfactant tails. At this point, the lipid tails of a part of the surfactants must be segregated from the water. Hence, they start to form micelles. In broad terms, above the CMC, the loss of entropy due to assembly of the surfactant molecules is less than the gain in entropy by setting free the water molecules that were "trapped" in the solvation shells of the surfactant monomers. Also important are enthalpic considerations, such as the electrostatic interactions that occur between the charged parts of surfactants.

== Micelle packing parameter ==
The micelle packing parameter equation is utilized to help "predict molecular self-assembly in surfactant solutions":

$$\frac{v_o}{a_e \ell_o}$$

where $v_o$ is the surfactant tail volume, $\ell_o$ is the tail length, and $a_e$ is the equilibrium area per molecule at the aggregate surface.

== Block copolymer micelles ==
The concept of micelles was introduced to describe the core-corona aggregates of small surfactant molecules, however it has also extended to describe aggregates of amphiphilic block copolymers in selective solvents. It is important to know the difference between these two systems. The major difference between these two types of aggregates is in the size of their building blocks. Surfactant molecules have a molecular weight which is generally of a few hundreds of grams per mole while block copolymers are generally one or two orders of magnitude larger. Moreover, thanks to the larger hydrophilic and hydrophobic parts, block copolymers can have a much more pronounced amphiphilic nature when compared to surfactant molecules.

Because of these differences in the building blocks, some block copolymer micelles behave like surfactant ones, while others do not. It is necessary therefore to make a distinction between the two situations. The former ones will belong to the dynamic micelles while the latter will be called kinetically frozen micelles.

=== Dynamic micelles ===
Certain amphiphilic block copolymer micelles display a similar behavior as surfactant micelles. These are generally called dynamic micelles and are characterized by the same relaxation processes assigned to surfactant exchange and micelle scission/recombination. Although the relaxation processes are the same between the two types of micelles, the kinetics of unimer exchange are very different. While in surfactant systems the unimers leave and join the micelles through a diffusion-controlled process, for copolymers the entry rate constant is slower than a diffusion controlled process. The rate of this process was found to be a decreasing power-law of the degree of polymerization of the hydrophobic block to the power 2/3. This difference is due to the coiling of the hydrophobic block of a copolymer exiting the core of a micelle.

Block copolymers which form dynamic micelles are some of the tri-block poloxamers under the right conditions.

=== Kinetically frozen micelles ===
When block copolymer micelles do not display the characteristic relaxation processes of surfactant micelles, these are called kinetically frozen micelles. These can be achieved in two ways: when the unimers forming the micelles are not soluble in the solvent of the micelle solution, or if the core forming blocks are glassy at the temperature in which the micelles are found. Kinetically frozen micelles are formed when either of these conditions is met. A special example in which both of these conditions are valid is that of polystyrene-b-poly(ethylene oxide). This block copolymer is characterized by the high hydrophobicity of the core forming block, PS, which causes the unimers to be insoluble in water. Moreover, PS has a high glass transition temperature which is, depending on the molecular weight, higher than room temperature. Thanks to these two characteristics, a water solution of PS-PEO micelles of sufficiently high molecular weight can be considered kinetically frozen. This means that none of the relaxation processes, which would drive the micelle solution towards thermodynamic equilibrium, are possible. Pioneering work on these micelles was done by Adi Eisenberg. It was also shown how the lack of relaxation processes allowed great freedom in the possible morphologies formed. Moreover, the stability against dilution and vast range of morphologies of kinetically frozen micelles make them particularly interesting, for example, for the development of long circulating drug delivery nanoparticles.

== Inverse/reverse micelles ==
In a non-polar solvent, it is the exposure of the hydrophilic head groups to the surrounding solvent that is energetically unfavourable, giving rise to a water-in-oil system. In this case, the hydrophilic groups are sequestered in the micelle core and the hydrophobic groups extend away from the center. These inverse micelles are proportionally less likely to form on increasing headgroup charge, since hydrophilic sequestration would create highly unfavorable electrostatic interactions.

It is well established that for many surfactant/solvent systems a small fraction of the inverse micelles spontaneously acquire a net charge of +q_{e} or -q_{e}. This charging takes place through a disproportionation/comproportionation mechanism rather than a dissociation/association mechanism and the equilibrium constant for this reaction is on the order of 10^{−4} to 10^{−11}, which means about every 1 in 100 to 1 in 100 000 micelles will be charged.

== Supermicelles ==
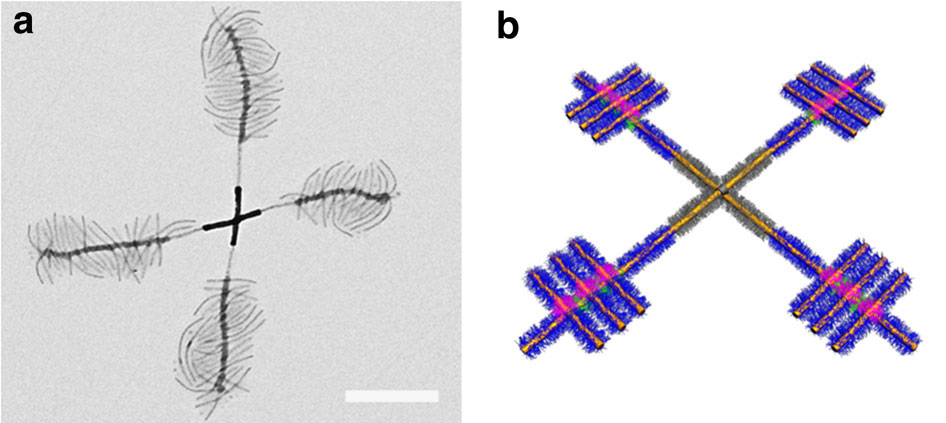
Electron micrograph of the windmill-like supermicelle, scale bar 500 nm

Supermicelle is a hierarchical micelle structure (supramolecular assembly) where individual components are also micelles. Supermicelles are formed via bottom-up chemical approaches, such as self-assembly of long cylindrical micelles into radial cross-, star- or dandelion-like patterns in a specially selected solvent; solid nanoparticles may be added to the solution to act as nucleation centers and form the central core of the supermicelle. The stems of the primary cylindrical micelles are composed of various block copolymers connected by strong covalent bonds; within the supermicelle structure they are loosely held together by hydrogen bonds, electrostatic or solvophobic interactions.

== Uses ==
Action of soap on oil

When surfactants are present above the critical micelle concentration (CMC), they can act as emulsifiers that will allow a compound that is normally insoluble (in the solvent being used) to dissolve. This occurs because the insoluble species can be incorporated into the micelle core, which is itself solubilized in the bulk solvent by virtue of the head groups' favorable interactions with solvent species. The most common example of this phenomenon is detergents, which clean poorly soluble lipophilic material (such as oils and waxes) that cannot be removed by water alone. Detergents clean also by lowering the surface tension of water, making it easier to remove material from a surface. The emulsifying property of surfactants is also the basis for emulsion polymerization.

Micelles may also have important roles in chemical reactions. Micellar chemistry uses the interior of micelles to harbor chemical reactions, which in some cases can make multi-step chemical synthesis more feasible. Doing so can increase reaction yield, create conditions more favorable to specific reaction products (e.g. hydrophobic molecules), and reduce required solvents, side products, and required conditions (e.g. extreme pH). Because of these benefits, Micellular chemistry is thus considered a form of green chemistry. However, micelle formation may also inhibit chemical reactions, such as when reacting molecules form micelles that shield a molecular component vulnerable to oxidation.

The use of cationic micelles of cetrimonium chloride, benzethonium chloride, and cetylpyridinium chloride can accelerate chemical reactions between negatively charged compounds (such as DNA or Coenzyme A) in an aqueous environment up to 5 million times. Unlike conventional micellar catalysis, the reactions occur solely on the charged micelles' surface.

Micelle formation is essential for the absorption of fat-soluble vitamins and complicated lipids within the human body. Bile salts formed in the liver and secreted by the gall bladder allow micelles of fatty acids to form. This allows the absorption of complicated lipids (e.g., lecithin) and lipid-soluble vitamins (A, D, E, and K) within the micelle by the small intestine.

During the process of milk-clotting, proteases act on the soluble portion of caseins, κ-casein, thus originating an unstable micellar state that results in clot formation.

Micelles can also be used for targeted drug delivery as gold nanoparticles.

== See also ==
- Critical micelle concentration
- Micellar liquid chromatography
- Micellar solutions
- Micellar solubilization
- Lipid bilayer
- Liposome
- Vesicle (biology)
