= Membrane models =

Models for cell membranes

Before the emergence of electron microscopy in the 1950s, scientists did not know the structure of a cell membrane or what its components were; biologists and other researchers used indirect evidence to identify membranes before they could actually be visualized. Specifically, it was through the models of Overton, Langmuir, Gorter and Grendel, and Davson and Danielli, that it was deduced that membranes have lipids, proteins, and a bilayer. The advent of the electron microscope, the findings of J. David Robertson, the proposal of Singer and Nicolson, and additional work of Unwin and Henderson all contributed to the development of the modern membrane model. However, understanding of past membrane models elucidates present-day perception of membrane characteristics. Following intense experimental research, the membrane models of the preceding century gave way to the fluid mosaic model that is generally accepted as a partial description.

== Gorter and Grendel's membrane theory (1925) ==
Diagram of the arrangement of amphipathic lipid molecules to form a lipid bilayer. The yellow polar head groups separate the grey hydrophobic tails from the aqueous cytosolic and extracellular environments.

Evert Gorter and François Grendel (Dutch physiologists) approached the discovery of our present model of the plasma membrane structure as a lipid bi-layer. They simply hypothesized that if the plasma membrane is a bi-layer, then the surface area of the mono-layer of lipids measured would be double the surface area of the plasma membrane. To examine their hypothesis, they performed an experiment in which they extracted lipids from a known number of red blood cells (erythrocytes) of different mammalian sources, such as humans, goats, sheep, etc. and then spreading the lipids as a mono-layer in a Langmuir-Blodgett trough. They measured the total surface area of the plasma membrane of red blood cells, and using Langmuir's method, they measured the area of the monolayer of lipids. In comparing the two, they calculated an estimated ratio of 2:1 _{Mono-layer of lipids: Plasma membrane}. This supported their hypothesis, which led to the conclusion that cell membranes are composed of two opposing molecular layers. The two scientists proposed a structure for this bi-layer, with the polar hydrophilic heads facing outwards towards the aqueous environment and the hydrophobic tails facing inwards away from the aqueous surroundings on both sides of the membrane. Although they arrived at the right conclusions, some of the experimental data were incorrect such as the miscalculation of the area and pressure of the lipid monolayer and the incompleteness of lipid extraction. They also failed to describe membrane function and had false assumptions such as that of plasma membranes consisting mostly of lipids. However, on the whole, this envisioning of the lipid bi-layer structure became the basic underlying assumption for each successive refinement in a modern understanding of membrane function.

== The Davson and Danielli model with backup from Robertson (1940–1960) ==
Following the proposal of Gorter and Grendel, doubts inevitably arose over the veracity of having just a simple lipid bi-layer as a membrane. For instance, their model could not provide answers to questions on surface tension, permeability, and the electric resistance of membranes. Therefore, physiologist Hugh Davson and biologist James Danielli suggested that membranes indeed do have proteins. According to them, the existence of these "membrane proteins" explained that which couldn't be answered by the Gorter-Grendel model.

In 1935, Davson and Danielli proposed that biological membranes are made up of lipid bi-layers that are coated on both sides with thin sheets of protein and they simplified their model into the "pauci-molecular" theory. This theory declared that all biological membranes have a "lipoid" center surrounded by mono-layers of lipid that are covered by protein mono-layers. In short, their model was illustrated as a "sandwich" of protein-lipid-protein. The Davson-Danielli model threw new light on the understanding of cell membranes, by stressing the important role played by proteins in biological membranes.

By the 1950s, cell biologists verified the existence of plasma membranes through the use of electron microscopy (which accounted for higher resolutions). J. David Robertson used this method to propose the unit membrane model. Basically, he suggested that all cellular membranes share a similar underlying structure, the unit membrane. Using heavy metal staining, Robertson's proposal also seemed to agree instantaneously with the Davson-Danielli model. According to the trilaminar pattern of the cellular membrane viewed by Robertson, he suggested that the membranes consist of a lipid bi-layer covered on both surfaces with thin sheets of proteins(mucoprotiens). This suggestion was a great boost to the proposal of Davson and Danielli. However, even with Robertson's substantiation, the Davson-Danielli model had serious complications, a major one being that the proteins studied were mainly globular and couldn't therefore fit into the model's claim of thin protein sheets. These difficulties with the model stimulated new research in membrane organization and paved the way for the fluid mosaic model, which was proposed in 1972.

== Singer and Nicolson's fluid mosaic model (1972) ==
In 1972, S. Jonathan Singer and Garth Nicolson developed new ideas for membrane structure. Their proposal was the fluid mosaic model, which is one of the dominant models now. It has two key features—a mosaic of proteins embedded in the membrane, and the membrane being a fluid bi-layer of lipids. The lipid bi-layer suggestion agrees with previous models but views proteins as globular entities embedded in the layer instead of thin sheets on the surface.

According to the model, membrane proteins are in three classes based on how they are linked to the lipid bi-layer:

1. Integral proteins: Immersed in the bi-layer and held in place by the affinity of hydrophobic parts of the protein for the hydrophobic tails of phospholipids on interior of the layer.
2. Peripheral proteins: More hydrophilic, and thus are non-covalently linked to the polar heads of phospholipids and other hydrophilic parts of other membrane proteins on the surface of the membrane.
3. Lipid anchored proteins: Essentially hydrophilic, so, are also located on the surface of the membrane, and are covalently attached to lipid molecules embedded in the layer.

As for the fluid nature of the membrane, the lipid components are capable of moving parallel to the membrane surface and are in constant motion. Many proteins are also capable of that motion within the membrane. However, some are restricted in their mobility due to them being anchored to structural elements such as the cytoskeleton on either side of the membrane.

In general, this model explains most of the criticisms of the Davson–Danielli model. It eliminated the need to accommodate membrane proteins in thin surface layers, proposed that the variability in the protein/lipid ratios of different membranes simply means that different membranes vary in the amount of protein they contain, and showed how the exposure of lipid-head groups at the membrane surface is compatible with their sensitivity to phospholipase digestion. Also, the fluidity of the lipid bi-layers and the intermingling of their components within the membrane make it easy to visualize the mobility of both lipids and proteins.

Singer and Nicolson's fluid mosaic model

== Kusumi et al's picket fence model (1990s) ==
The picket fence model suggests membranes are subdivided into compartments by the underlying actin-based cytoskeleton and its associated transmembrane “pickets.” Pickets form semi-permeable barriers that impede the free diffusion of other membrane proteins and lipids. The “fence” is constituted by the actin filaments themselves. Proteins and lipids can diffuse between compartments, but do so at a slower rate than intra-compartment diffusion.

== See also ==
- Cell biology
- Cell theory
- History of cell membrane theory
- Membrane protein
