= History of cell membrane theory =

Cell theory has its origins in seventeenth century microscopy observations, but it was nearly two hundred years before a complete cell membrane theory was developed to explain what separates cells from the outside world. By the 19th century it was accepted that some form of semi-permeable barrier must exist around a cell. Studies of the action of anesthetic molecules led to the theory that this barrier might be made of some sort of fat (lipid), but the structure was still unknown. A series of pioneering experiments in 1925 indicated that this barrier membrane consisted of two molecular layers of lipids—a lipid bilayer. New tools over the next few decades confirmed this theory, but controversy remained regarding the role of proteins in the cell membrane. Eventually the fluid mosaic model was composed in which proteins “float” in a fluid lipid bilayer "sea". Although simplistic and incomplete, this model is still widely referenced today.

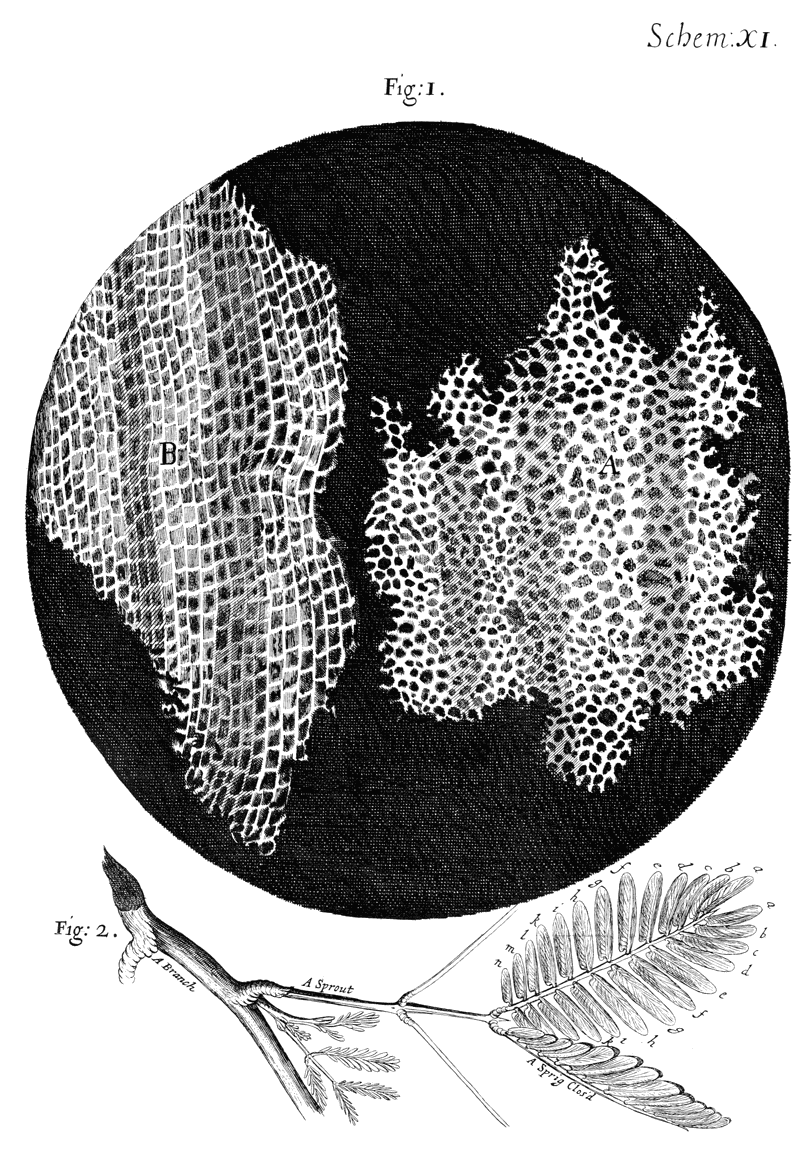
Sketch of cork through a microscope. Cork was one of the first substances examined by Robert Hooke through his microscope and he found that it was composed of thousands of minute pockets he named "cells".

== Early barrier theories ==
Since the invention of the microscope in the seventeenth century it has been known that plant and animal tissue is composed of cells : the cell was discovered by Robert Hooke. The plant cell wall was easily visible even with these early microscopes but no similar barrier was visible on animal cells, though it stood to reason that one must exist. By the mid 19th century, this question was being actively investigated and Moritz Traube noted that this outer layer must be semipermeable to allow transport of ions. Traube had no direct evidence for the composition of this film, though, and incorrectly asserted that it was formed by an interfacial reaction of the cell protoplasm with the extracellular fluid.

The lipid nature of the cell membrane was first correctly intuited by Georg Hermann Quincke in 1888, who noted that a cell generally forms a spherical shape in water and, when broken in half, forms two smaller spheres. The only other known material to exhibit this behavior was oil. He also noted that a thin film of oil behaves as a semipermeable membrane, precisely as predicted. Based on these observations, Quincke asserted that the cell membrane comprised a fluid layer of fat less than 100 nm thick. This theory was further extended by evidence from the study of anesthetics. Hans Horst Meyer and Ernest Overton independently noticed that the chemicals which act as general anesthetics are also those soluble in both water and oil. They interpreted this as meaning that to pass the cell membrane a molecule must be at least sparingly soluble in oil, their “lipoid theory of narcosis.” Based on this evidence and further experiments, they concluded that the cell membrane might be made of lecithin (phosphatidylcholine) and cholesterol. One of the early criticisms of this theory was that it included no mechanism for energy-dependent selective transport. This “flaw” remained unanswered for nearly half a century until the discovery that specialized molecules called integral membrane proteins can act as ion transportation pumps.

== Discovery of lipid bilayer structure ==
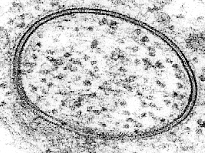
A micrograph from a Transmission Electron Micrograph showing a lipid vesicle. The two dark bands are the two leaflets comprising the bilayer. Similar images taken in the 1950s and 1960s confirmed the bilayer nature of the cell membrane

Thus, by the early twentieth century the chemical, but not the structural nature of the cell membrane was known. Two experiments in 1924 laid the groundwork to fill in this gap. By measuring the capacitance of erythrocyte solutions Fricke determined that the cell membrane was 3.3 nm thick. Although the results of this experiment were accurate, Fricke misinterpreted the data to mean that the cell membrane is a single molecular layer. Because the polar lipid headgroups are fully hydrated, they do not show up in a capacitance measurement meaning that this experiment actually measured the thickness of the hydrocarbon core, not the whole bilayer. Gorter and Grendel approached the problem from a different perspective, performing a solvent extraction of erythrocyte lipids and spreading the resulting material as a monolayer on a Langmuir-Blodgett trough. When they compared the area of the monolayer to the surface area of the cells, they found a ratio of two to one. Later analyses of this experiment showed several problems including an incorrect monolayer pressure, incomplete lipid extraction and a miscalculation of cell surface area. In spite of these issues the fundamental conclusion- that the cell membrane is a lipid bilayer- was correct.

A decade later, Davson and Danielli proposed a modification to this concept. In their model, the lipid bilayer was coated on either side with a layer of globular proteins. According to their view, this protein coat had no particular structure and was simply formed by adsorption from solution. Their theory was also incorrect in that it ascribed the barrier properties of the membrane to electrostatic repulsion from the protein layer rather than the energetic cost of crossing the hydrophobic core. A more direct investigation of the membrane was made possible through the use of electron microscopy in the late 1950s. After staining with heavy metal labels, Sjöstrand et al. noted two thin dark bands separated by a light region, which they incorrectly interpreted as a single molecular layer of protein. A more accurate interpretation was made by J. David Robertson, who determined that the dark electron-dense bands were the headgroups and associated proteins of two apposed lipid monolayers. In this body of work, Robertson put forward the concept of the “unit membrane.” This was the first time the bilayer structure had been universally assigned to all cell membranes as well as organelle membranes.

=== Evolution of the membrane theory ===
The idea of a semipermeable membrane, a barrier that is permeable to solvent but impermeable to solute molecules was developed at about the same time. The term osmosis originated in 1827 and its importance to physiological phenomena realized, but it was not until 1877 when the botanist Wilhelm Pfeffer proposed the membrane theory of cell physiology. In this view, the cell was seen to be enclosed by a thin surface, the plasma membrane, and cell water and solutes such as a potassium ion existed in a physical state like that of a dilute solution. In 1889, Hamburger used hemolysis of erythrocytes to determine the permeability of various solutes. By measuring the time required for the cells to swell past their elastic limit, the rate at which solutes entered the cells could be estimated by the accompanying change in cell volume. He also found that there was an apparent nonsolvent volume of about 50% in red blood cells and later showed that this includes water of hydration in addition to the protein and other nonsolvent components of the cells. Ernest Overton (a distant cousin of Charles Darwin) first proposed the concept of a lipid (oil) plasma membrane in 1899. The major weakness of the lipid membrane was the lack of an explanation of the high permeability to water, so Nathansohn (1904) proposed the mosaic theory. In this view, the membrane is not a pure lipid layer, but a mosaic of areas with lipid and areas with semipermeable gel. Ruhland refined the mosaic theory to include pores to allow additional passage of small molecules. Since membranes are generally less permeable to anions, Leonor Michaelis concluded that ions are adsorbed to the walls of the pores, changing the permeability of the pores to ions by electrostatic repulsion. Michaelis demonstrated the membrane potential (1926) and proposed that it was related to the distribution of ions across the membrane. Harvey and James Danielli (1939) proposed a lipid bilayer membrane covered on each side with a layer of protein to account for measurements of surface tension. In 1941 Boyle & Conway showed that the membrane of resting frog muscle was permeable to both K+ and Cl-, but apparently not to Na+, so the idea of electrical charges in the pores was unnecessary since a single critical pore size explained the permeability to K+, H+, and Cl- as well as the impermeability to Na+, Ca+, and Mg++.

=== The emergence of the steady-state membrane pump concept ===
With the development of radioactive tracers, it was shown that cells are not impermeable to Na+. This was difficult to explain with the membrane barrier theory, so the sodium pump was proposed to continually remove Na+ as it permeates cells. This drove the concept that cells are in a state of dynamic equilibrium, constantly using energy to maintain ion gradients. In 1935, Karl Lohmann discovered ATP and its role as a source of energy for cells, so the concept of a metabolically-driven sodium pump was proposed. The tremendous success of Hodgkin, Huxley, and Katz in the development of the membrane theory of cellular membrane potentials, with differential equations that modeled the phenomena correctly, provided even more support for the membrane pump hypothesis.

The modern view of the plasma membrane is of a fluid lipid bilayer that has protein components embedded within it. The structure of the membrane is now known in great detail, including 3D models of many of the hundreds of different proteins that are bound to the membrane. These major developments in cell physiology placed the membrane theory in a position of dominance.

== Fluid mosaic model ==
Diagram of a cell membrane showing integral and peripheral membrane proteins

Around the same time the development of the first model membrane, the painted bilayer, allowed direct investigation of the properties of a simple artificial bilayer. By “painting” a reconstituted lipid solution across an aperture, Mueller and Rudin were able to determine that the resulting bilayer exhibited lateral fluidity, high electrical resistance and self-healing in response to puncture. This form of model bilayer soon became known as a “BLM” although from the beginning the meaning of this acronym has been ambiguous. As early as 1966, BLM was used to mean either “black lipid membrane” or "bimolecular lipid membrane".

This same lateral fluidity was first demonstrated conclusively on the cell surface by Frye and Edidin in 1970. They fused two cells labeled with different membrane-bound fluorescent tags and watched as the two dye populations mixed. The results of this experiment were key in the development of the "fluid mosaic" model of the cell membrane by Singer and Nicolson in 1972. According to this model, biological membranes are composed largely of bare lipid bilayer with proteins penetrating either half way or all the way through the membrane. These proteins are visualized as freely floating within a completely liquid bilayer. This was not the first proposal of a heterogeneous membrane structure. Indeed, as early as 1904 Nathansohn proposed a “mosaic” of water permeable and impermeable regions. But the fluid mosaic model was the first to correctly incorporate fluidity, membrane channels and multiple modes of protein/bilayer coupling into one theory.

== Modern research ==
Continued research has revealed some shortcomings and simplifications in the original theory. For instance, channel proteins are described as having a continuous water channel through their center, which is now known to be generally untrue (an exception being nuclear pore complexes, which have a 9 nm open water channel). Also, free diffusion on the cell surface is often limited to areas a few tens of nanometers across. These limits to lateral fluidity are due to cytoskeleton anchors, lipid phase separation and aggregated protein structures. Contemporary studies also indicate that much less of the plasma membrane is “bare” lipid than previously thought and in fact much of the cell surface may be protein-associated. In spite of these limitations, the fluid mosaic model remains a popular and often referenced general notion for the structure of biological membranes.

== Obsolete theories ==
The modern mainstream consensus model of cellular membranes is based on the fluid-mosaic model that envisions a lipid bilayer separating the inside from the outside of cells with associated ion channels, pumps and transporters giving rise to the permeability processes of cells. Alternative hypotheses were developed in the past that have largely been rejected. One of these opposing concepts developed in the 1980's within the context of studies on osmosis, permeability, and electrical properties of cells was that of Gilbert Ling. The modern idea holds that these properties all belonged to the plasma membrane whereas Ling's view was that the protoplasm was responsible for these properties.

As support for the lipid bilayer membrane theory grew, this alternative concept was developed which denied the importance of the lipid bilayer membrane. In 1916, Procter & Wilson demonstrated that gels, which do not have a semipermeable membrane, swelled in dilute solutions. Loeb (1920) also studied gelatin extensively, with and without a membrane, showing that more of the properties attributed to the plasma membrane could be duplicated in gels without a membrane. In particular, he found that an electrical potential difference between the gelatin and the outside medium could be developed, based on the H+ concentration.

Some criticisms of the membrane theory developed in the 1930s, based on observations such as the ability of some cells to swell and increase their surface area by a factor of 1000 (as in adipose tissue). A lipid layer cannot stretch to that extent without becoming a patchwork (thereby losing its barrier properties). Such criticisms stimulated continued studies on protoplasm as the principal agent determining cell permeability properties. In 1938, Fischer and Suer proposed that water in the protoplasm is not free but in a chemically combined form, and that the protoplasm represents a combination of protein, salt and water. They demonstrated the basic similarity between swelling in living tissues and the swelling of gelatin and fibrin gels. Dimitri Nasonov (1944) viewed proteins as the central components responsible for many properties of the cell, including electrical properties.

By the 1940s, the bulk phase theories were not as well developed as the membrane theories and were largely rejected. In 1941, Brooks & Brooks published a monograph The Permeability of Living Cells, which rejected the bulk phase theories.
