= Gilbert Ling =

American scientist (1919–2019)

Gilbert Ning Ling
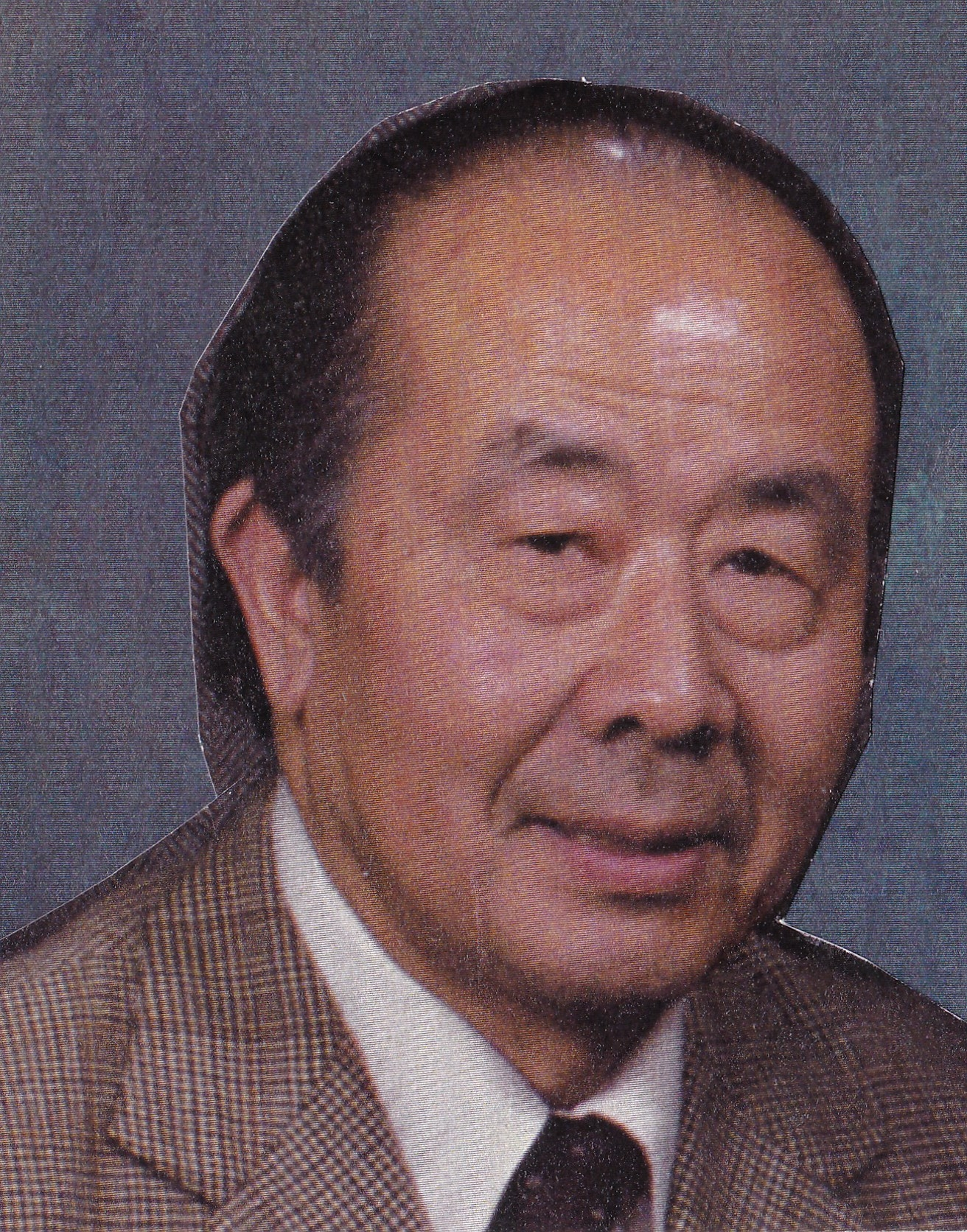
- Ling in 2001
- Born: 26 December 1919; Nanjing, Republic of China
- Died: 10 November 2019 (aged 99); California, U.S.
- Education: National Central University (B.S.); University of Chicago (Ph.D.)
- Spouse: Shirley Wang Ling (m. 1951–2011) (deceased)
- Children: 3
- Scientific career
- Fields: Cell biology Cell physiology Molecular biology Cell membrane
- Workplaces: National Central University; University of Chicago; Johns Hopkins University; University of Illinois Chicago; Pennsylvania Hospital; Fonar Corp. Basic Research Dept
- Thesis: The effects of metabolism, temperature and other factors on the membrane potential of single frog muscle fibers (1948)

Chinese name
- Traditional Chinese: 凌寧
- Simplified Chinese: 凌宁
Transcriptions
Standard Mandarin
- Hanyu Pinyin: Líng Níng
- Website: www.gilbertling.org

Gilbert Ning Ling (December 26, 1919 – November 10, 2019) was a Chinese-born American cell physiologist, biochemist, and scientific investigator.

In 1944, Ling won the biology slot of the sixth Boxer Indemnity Scholarship: a nationwide competitive examination that gave Chinese science and engineering students full scholarship to study in a United States university. In 1947, he co-developed the Gerard-Graham-Ling microelectrode: a device that allows scientists to more accurately measure the electrical potentials of living cells. In 1962, he proposed the Association induction hypothesis, a general theory of the living cell that offers an alternative model to the membrane pump theory. Rather than relying on energy-dependent membrane pumps to maintain the cell's internal composition, the hypothesis posits that water and proteins inside cells exist in a structured state that naturally associates with certain ions, such as potassium, and excludes others, such as sodium, based on their physical and chemical properties. Three years later he proposed the Polarized-Oriented Multilayer (PM or POM) theory of cell water.

Ling carried out scientific experiments that attempted to disprove the accepted view of the cell as a membrane containing a number of pumps such as the sodium potassium pump and the calcium pump and channels that engage in active transport.

He died in November 2019, one month short of turning 100.

== Early life and education ==
Ling was born in December 1919, in Nanjing, China. He grew up in Beijing and entered the National Central University (Nanking University) in Chongqing as a student of animal husbandry. After two years, he transferred to the biology department and received a Biology B.Sc. degree, minoring in physics and chemistry in 1943.

In 1944, having done graduate work in Biochemistry at the National Southwestern Associated University (National Tsinghua University) in Kunming, Ling won the sixth Boxer Indemnity Scholarship. In early 1946 he began his graduate study in the department of physiology at the University of Chicago under Professor Ralph W. Gerard. In 1948 he completed his Ph.D on the effects of metabolism, temperature and other factors on the membrane potential of single frog muscle fibers which was published in December 1949 in a series of 4 papers in the Journal of Cellular and Comparative Physiology, Volume 34, Issue 3. He spent two more years under Prof. Gerard as a Seymour Coman Postdoctoral Fellow. In 1974, Lawrence G. Palmer and Jagdish Gulati tested one aspect of Ling's theories: whether potassium ions within the cell are bound, or free. Contrary to Ling's prediction, they found that potassium ions within frog skeletal muscle cells are free.

== Academic career ==
In 1944, Ling won the only biology slot of the sixth nationwide Boxer Indemnity Fellowship, to study physiology in the United States, which he took up in January 1946.

From 1950 to 1953 Ling worked as an instructor at the medical school of the Johns Hopkins University in Baltimore. His research and experiments led him to the conclusion that the mainstream membrane pump theory of the living cell was not correct. This early embryonic version of the association induction hypothesis was called Ling's fixed charge hypothesis (LFCH).

From 1953 to 1957, he continued full-time research at the Neuropsychiatric Institute at the University of Illinois Medical School in Chicago. Beginning as an assistant professor, he was promoted two years later to (tenured) associate professorship.

In 1957, he accepted the position of senior research scientist at the basic research department of the newly founded Eastern Pennsylvania Psychiatric Institute.

In 1962 his first book, entitled A Physical Theory of the Living State: the Association-Induction Hypothesis, was published. At this time Ling became director of a research laboratory at the Pennsylvania Hospital in Philadelphia.

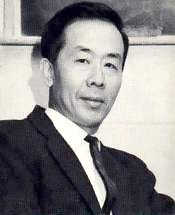
Ling in 1962 after publication of his first book

In 1984, Ling published his second book, In Search of the Physical Basis of Life.

In October 1988, Ling's laboratory shut down due to his inability to obtain research funds from National Institutes of Health and other funding agencies. Raymond Vahan Damadian offered to support him and two of his staff, Margaret Ochsenfeld and Dr. Zhen-dong Chen.

From 1982 to 1985 he was a co–editor-in-chief of the Physiological Chemistry & Physics and Medical NMR journal and after 1986 served as sole editor-in-chief.

In 1992 Ling published his third book, A Revolution in the Physiology of the Living Cell.

In 2001 his fourth book, Life at the Cell and Below-Cell Level, was published and subsequently translated into Russian and Chinese.

In 2011 his wife of sixty years, Shirley Wang Ling, died of pancreatic cancer. In 2014, at the age of ninety-four, he published his fifth book, What is Life Answered, a response to Erwin Schrödinger's 1944 book What is Life? He published over two hundred scientific papers, although much of his later work was largely ignored by the scientific community.

== Gerard-Graham-Ling microelectrode ==
Also known as the Ling-Gerard microelectrode and after the 1940s further developed into the glass capillary microelectrode has played a vital role in modern neurophysiology and medicine.

John Eccles applied the microelectrode to studies of activity of individual units within the spinal cord and brain and Andrew Huxley used it in muscle cells.

In 1963, Hodgkin with Huxley, won the Nobel Prize in Physiology or Medicine for their work on the basis of nerve "action potentials," the electrical impulses which enable the activity of an organism to be coordinated by a central nervous system. Hodgkin and Huxley shared the prize that year with John Eccles, who was cited for his research on synapses. Worldwide use of this new microelectrode spread rapidly after this and has subsequently proven to be one of the most important devices applied to the study of cellular physiology. The microelectrode in use today is essentially the same as this, except that it usually contains a concentrated salt solution, and is commonly referred to as the glass capillary. In 1950 Gerard was nominated for the Nobel Prize for helping to develop the microelectrode as used in electrophysiology.

== Association induction hypothesis ==
An alternative and controversial hypothesis to the membrane and membrane pump theories, the association induction hypothesis is a claim related to the properties and activities of microscopic assemblies of molecules, atoms, ions, and electrons of the smallest unit of life called nano-protoplasm.

Ling wrote books describing his hypothesis in 1962 and 1984, and later self-published other books.

== Polarized-oriented multilayer theory ==
In 1965, Ling added his polarized-oriented multilayer of cell water to the association induction hypothesis. The theory argues that intracellular water is polarized and oriented and thus dynamically structured.

== See also ==
- Membrane potential
- Sodium-potassium pump
- Cell membrane
- History of cell membrane theory

== Publications ==
- Gilbert N. Ling. A Physical Theory of the Living State: the Association-Induction Hypothesis. Blaisdell Publishing Company, A Division of Random House, Inc., London. 1962. 682 pages. Library of Congress Catalogue Number: 62-11835
- Gilbert N. Ling. In Search of the Physical Basis of Life. Plenum Press, New York and London. 1984. 791 pages. ISBN 0-306-41409-0
- Gilbert N. Ling. A Revolution in the Physiology of the Living Cell. Krieger Publishing Company, Malabar, Florida. 1992. 378 pages. ISBN 0-89464-398-3
- Gilbert N. Ling. Life at the Cell and Below-Cell Level: The Hidden History of a Fundamental. Revolution in Biology. New York: Pacific Press. 2001. 373 pages. ISBN 0-9707322-0-1
- Gilbert N. Ling. What is Life Answered. Cushing Malloy Inc., Ann Arbor, Michigan. 2013. 120 pages. ISBN 978-0-615-94793-8
