= Fluid mosaic model =

Model of cell membranes

Fluid mosaic model is a model that explains the structure of cell membranes

The fluid mosaic model explains various characteristics regarding the structure of functional cell membranes. According to this biological model, there is a lipid bilayer (a two-molecule-thick layer consisting primarily of amphipathic phospholipids) in which protein molecules are embedded. The phospholipid bilayer gives fluidity and elasticity to the membrane. Small amounts of carbohydrates are also found in the cell membrane. The biological model, which was devised by Seymour Jonathan Singer and Garth L. Nicolson in 1972, describes the cell membrane as a two-dimensional liquid where embedded proteins are generally randomly distributed. For example, it is stated that "A prediction of the fluid mosaic model is that the two-dimensional long-range distribution of any integral protein in the plane of the membrane is essentially random."

== Chemical makeup ==
Components	Location	Functions
Phospholipid	The main fabric of plasma membrane. Derived from fatty acids, joined by an alcohol residue	It provides selective permeability to the cell membrane. The hydrophilic phosphate side is outwards and hydrophobic inwards.
Carbohydrates	Attached to proteins on outside membrane layers	It helps in cell-to-cell recognition.
Cholesterol	Between phospholipids and phospholipid bilayers	It helps the plasma membrane to retain its fluidity.
Proteins	Embedded within or on the surface of phospholipid layers	These form channels to allow the movement of molecules.

== Experimental evidence ==
The fluid property of functional biological membranes had been determined through labeling experiments, x-ray diffraction, and calorimetry. These studies showed that integral membrane proteins diffuse at rates affected by the viscosity of the lipid bilayer in which they were embedded, and demonstrated that the molecules within the cell membrane are dynamic rather than static.

Previous models of biological membranes included the Robertson Unit Membrane Model and the Davson-Danielli Tri-Layer model. These models had proteins present as sheets neighboring a lipid layer, rather than incorporated into the phospholipid bilayer. Other models described repeating, regular units of protein and lipid. These models were not well supported by microscopy and thermodynamic data, and did not accommodate evidence for dynamic membrane properties.

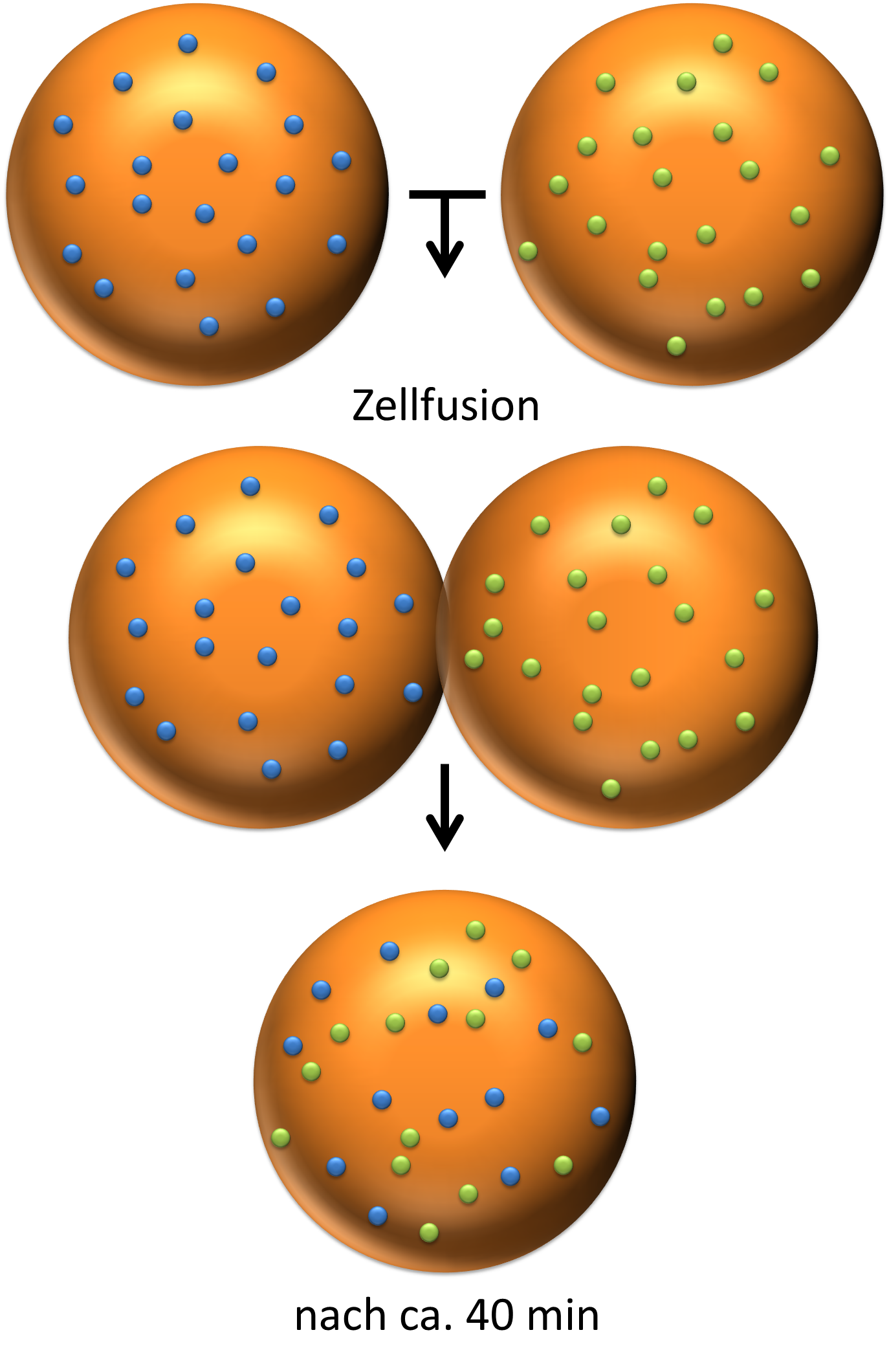
The Frye-Edidin experiment showed that when two cells are fused the proteins of both diffuse around the membrane and mingle rather than being locked to their area of the membrane.

An important experiment that provided evidence supporting fluid and dynamic biological membranes was performed by Frye and Edidin. They used Sendai virus to force human and mouse cells to fuse and form a heterokaryon. Using antibody staining, they were able to show that the mouse and human proteins remained segregated to separate halves of the heterokaryon a short time after cell fusion. However, the proteins eventually diffused and over time the border between the two halves was lost. Lowering the temperature slowed the rate of this diffusion by causing the membrane phospholipids to transition from a fluid to a gel phase. Singer and Nicolson rationalized the results of these experiments using their fluid mosaic model.

The fluid mosaic model explains changes in structure and behavior of cell membranes under different temperatures, as well as the association of membrane proteins with the membranes. While Singer and Nicolson had substantial evidence drawn from multiple subfields to support their model, recent advances in fluorescence microscopy and structural biology have validated the fluid mosaic nature of cell membranes.

== Subsequent developments ==
=== Membrane asymmetry ===
Additionally, the two leaflets of biological membranes are asymmetric and divided into subdomains composed of specific proteins or lipids, allowing spatial segregation of biological processes associated with membranes. Cholesterol and cholesterol-interacting proteins can concentrate into lipid rafts and constrain cell signaling processes to only these rafts. Another form of asymmetry was shown by the work of Mouritsen and Bloom in 1984, where they proposed a Mattress Model of lipid-protein interactions to address the biophysical evidence that the membrane can range in thickness and hydrophobicity of proteins.

=== Non-bilayer membranes ===
The existence of non-bilayer lipid formations with important biological functions was confirmed subsequent to publication of the fluid mosaic model. These membrane structures may be useful when the cell needs to propagate a non bilayer form, which occurs during cell division and the formation of a gap junction.

=== Membrane curvature ===
The membrane bilayer is not always flat. Local curvature of the membrane can be caused by the asymmetry and non-bilayer organization of lipids as discussed above. More dramatic and functional curvature is achieved through BAR domains, which bind to phosphatidylinositol on the membrane surface, assisting in vesicle formation, organelle formation and cell division. Curvature development is in constant flux and contributes to the dynamic nature of biological membranes.

=== Lipid movement within the membrane ===
During the 1970s, it was acknowledged that individual lipid molecules undergo free lateral diffusion within each of the layers of the lipid membrane. Diffusion occurs at a high speed, with an average lipid molecule diffusing ~2μm, approximately the length of a large bacterial cell, in about 1 second. It has also been observed that individual lipid molecules rotate rapidly around their own axis. Moreover, phospholipid molecules can, although they seldom do, migrate from one side of the lipid bilayer to the other (a process known as flip-flop). However, flip-flop movement is enhanced by flippase enzymes. The processes described above influence the disordered nature of lipid molecules and interacting proteins in the lipid membranes, with consequences to membrane fluidity, signaling, trafficking and function.

== Restrictions to lateral diffusion ==
There are restrictions to the lateral mobility of the lipid and protein components in the fluid membrane imposed by zonation. Early attempts to explain the assembly of membrane zones include the formation of lipid rafts and "cytoskeletal fences", corrals wherein lipid and membrane proteins can diffuse freely, but that they can seldom leave. These ideas remain controversial, and alternative explanations are available such as the proteolipid code.

=== Lipid rafts ===
Lipid rafts are membrane nanometric platforms with a particular lipid and protein composition that laterally diffuse, navigating on the liquid bilipid layer. Sphingolipids and cholesterol are important building blocks of the lipid rafts.

=== Protein complexes ===
Cell membrane proteins and glycoproteins do not exist as single elements of the lipid membrane, as first proposed by Singer and Nicolson in 1972. Rather, they occur as diffusing complexes within the membrane. The assembly of single molecules into these macromolecular complexes has important functional consequences for the cell; such as ion and metabolite transport, signaling, cell adhesion, and migration.

=== Cytoskeletal fences (corrals) and binding to the extracellular matrix ===
Some proteins embedded in the bilipid layer interact with the extracellular matrix outside the cell, cytoskeleton filaments inside the cell, and septin ring-like structures. These interactions have a strong influence on shape and structure, as well as on compartmentalization. Moreover, they impose physical constraints that restrict the free lateral diffusion of proteins and at least some lipids within the bilipid layer.

When integral proteins of the lipid bilayer are tethered to the extracellular matrix, they are unable to diffuse freely. Proteins with a long intracellular domain may collide with a fence formed by cytoskeleton filaments. Both processes restrict the diffusion of proteins and lipids directly involved, as well as of other interacting components of the cell membranes.

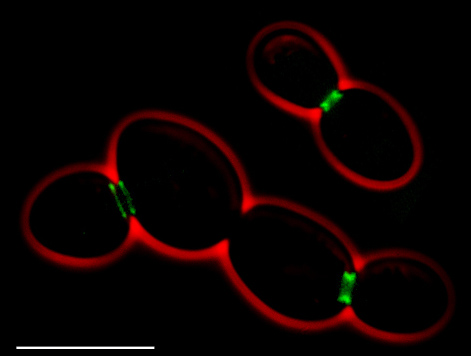
S.cerevisiae septins Septin ring-like structures (in green) can pinch cell membranes and split them into subdomains.

Septins are a family of GTP-binding proteins highly conserved among eukaryotes. Prokaryotes have similar proteins called paraseptins. They form compartmentalizing ring-like structures strongly associated with the cell membranes. Septins are involved in the formation of structures such as, cilia and flagella, dendritic spines, and yeast buds.

== Historical timeline ==
- 1895 – Ernest Overton hypothesized that cell membranes are made out of lipids.
- 1925 – Evert Gorter and François Grendel found that red blood cell membranes are formed by a fatty layer two molecules thick, i.e. they described the bilipid nature of the cell membrane.
- 1935 – Hugh Davson and James Danielli proposed that lipid membranes are layers composed by proteins and lipids with pore-like structures that allow specific permeability for certain molecules. Then, they suggested a model for the cell membrane, consisting of a lipid layer surrounded by protein layers at both sides of it.
- 1957 – J. David Robertson, based on electron microscopy studies, establishes the "Unit Membrane Hypothesis". This, states that all membranes in the cell, i.e. plasma and organelle membranes, have the same structure: a bilayer of phospholipids with monolayers of proteins at both sides of it.
- 1972 – SJ Singer and GL Nicolson proposed the fluid mosaic model as an explanation for the data and latest evidence regarding the structure and thermodynamics of cell membranes.
- 1997 – K Simons and E Ikonen proposed the lipid raft theory as an initial explanation of membrane zonation.
- 2024 – TA Kervin and M Overduin proposed the proteolipid code to fully explain membrane zonation as the lipid raft theory became increasingly controversial.
