= Cell theory =

Theory that living organisms are made up of cells

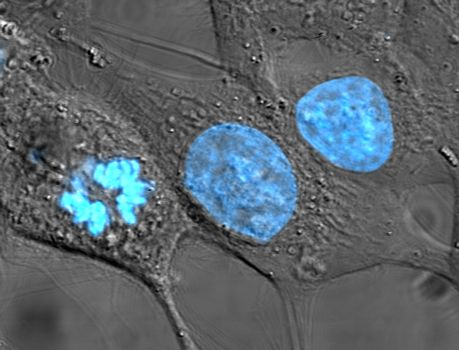
Human cancer cells with nuclei (specifically the DNA) stained blue. The central and rightmost cell are in interphase, so the entire nuclei are labeled. The cell on the left is going through mitosis and its DNA has condensed.

In biology, cell theory is a scientific theory first formulated in the mid-nineteenth century, that living organisms are made up of cells, that they are the basic structural/organizational unit of all organisms, and that all cells come from pre-existing cells. Cells are the basic unit of structure in all living organisms and also the basic unit of reproduction.

Cell theory has traditionally been accepted as the governing theory of all life, but some biologists consider non-cellular entities such as viruses living organisms and thus disagree with the universal application of cell theory to all forms of life.

== History ==
With continual improvements made to microscopes over time, magnification technology became advanced enough to discover cells. This discovery is largely attributed to Robert Hooke, and began the scientific study of cells, known as cell biology. When observing a piece of cork under the scope, he was able to see pores. This was shocking at the time as it was believed no one else had seen these. To further support his theory, Matthias Schleiden and Theodor Schwann both also studied cells of both animal and plants. What they discovered were significant differences between the two types of cells. This put forth the idea that cells were not only fundamental to plants, but animals as well.

== Microscopes ==
The discovery of the cell was made possible through the invention of the microscope. In the first century BC, Romans were able to make glass. They discovered that objects appeared to be larger under the glass. The expanded use of lenses in eyeglasses in the 13th century probably led to wider spread use of simple microscopes (magnifying glasses) with limited magnification. Compound microscopes, which combine an objective lens with an eyepiece to view a real image achieving much higher magnification, first appeared in Europe around 1620. In 1665, Robert Hooke used a microscope about six inches long with two convex lenses inside and examined specimens under reflected light for the observations in his book Micrographia. Hooke also used a simpler microscope with a single lens for examining specimens with directly transmitted light, because this allowed for a clearer image.

An extensive microscopic study was done by Anton van Leeuwenhoek, a draper who took the interest in microscopes after seeing one while on an apprenticeship in Amsterdam in 1648. At some point in his life before 1668, he was able to learn how to grind lenses. This eventually led to Leeuwenhoek making his own unique microscope. He made one with a single lens. He was able to use a single lens that was a small glass sphere but allowed for a magnification of 270x. This was a large progression since the magnification before was only a maximum of 50x. After Leeuwenhoek, there was not much progress in microscope technology until the 1850s, two hundred years later. Carl Zeiss, a German engineer who manufactured microscopes, began to make changes to the lenses used. But the optical quality did not improve until the 1880s when he hired Otto Schott and eventually Ernst Abbe.

Optical microscopes can focus on objects the size of a wavelength or larger, giving restrictions still to advancement in discoveries with objects smaller than the wavelengths of visible light. The development of the electron microscope in the 1920s made it possible to view objects that are smaller than optical wavelengths, once again opening up new possibilities in science.

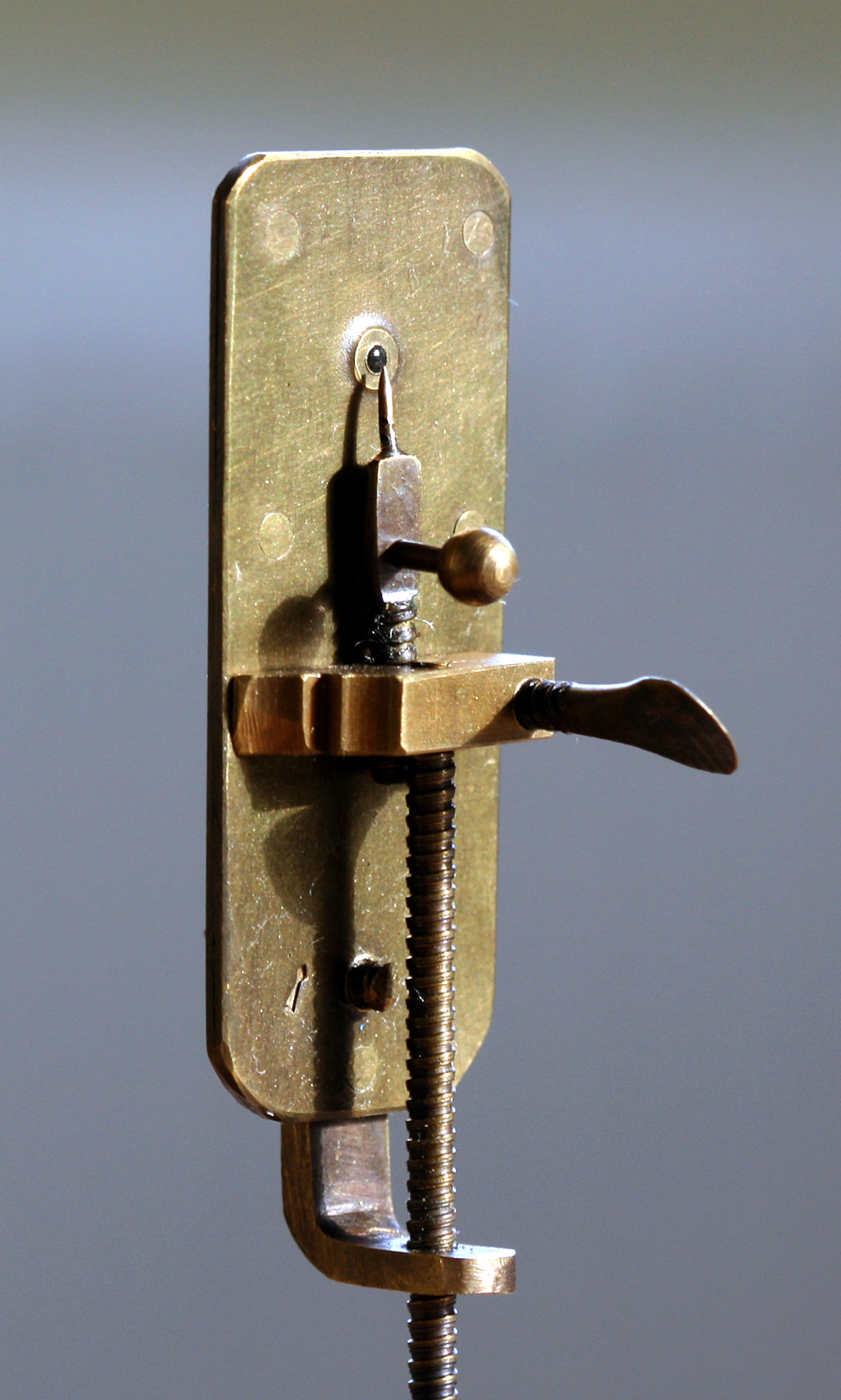
A reproduction of Anton van Leeuwenhoek's 17th century microscope with magnification of up to 300x

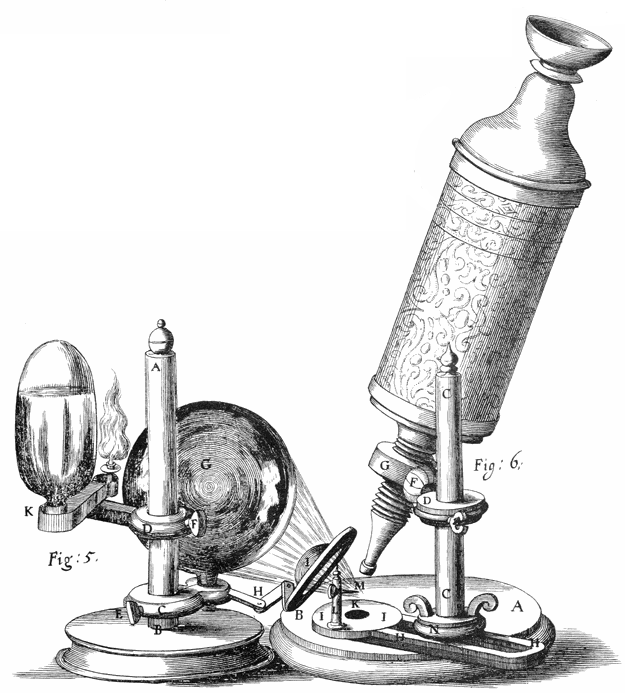
Robert Hooke's microscope setup, as depicted in Micrographia

== Discovery of cells ==
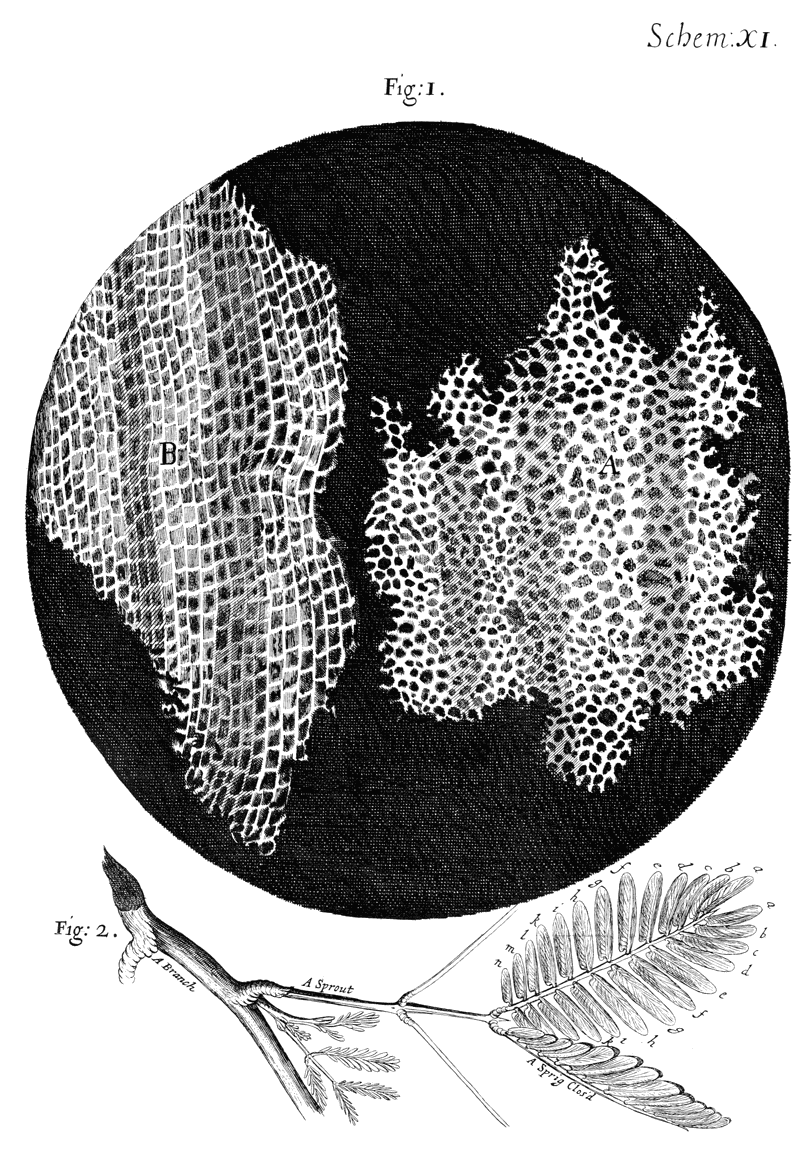
Drawing of the structure of cork by Robert Hooke that appeared in Micrographia

The cell was first discovered by Robert Hooke in 1665, which can be found to be described in his book Micrographia. In this book, he gave 60 observations in detail of various objects under a coarse, compound microscope. One observation was from very thin slices of bottle cork. Hooke discovered a multitude of tiny pores that he named "cells". This came from the Latin word Cella, meaning ‘a small room’ like monks lived in, and also Cellulae, which meant the six-sided cell of a honeycomb. However, Hooke did not know their real structure or function. What Hooke had thought were cells, were actually empty cell walls of plant tissues. With microscopes during this time having a low magnification, Hooke was unable to see that there were other internal components to the cells he was observing. Therefore, he did not think the "cellulae" were alive. His cell observations gave no indication of the nucleus and other organelles found in most living cells. In Micrographia, Hooke also observed mould, bluish in color, found on leather. After studying it under his microscope, he was unable to observe "seeds" that would have indicated how the mould was multiplying in quantity. This led to Hooke suggesting that spontaneous generation, from either natural or artificial heat, was the cause. Since this was an old Aristotelian theory still accepted at the time, others did not reject it and was not disproved until Leeuwenhoek later discovered that generation was achieved otherwise.

Anton van Leeuwenhoek is another scientist who saw these cells soon after Hooke did. He made use of a microscope containing improved lenses that could magnify objects 270-fold. Under these microscopes, Leeuwenhoek found motile objects. In a letter to The Royal Society on October 9, 1676, he states that motility is a quality of life therefore these were living organisms. Over time, he wrote many more papers which described many specific forms of microorganisms. Leeuwenhoek named these "animalcules," which included protozoa and other unicellular organisms, like bacteria. Though he did not have much formal education, he was able to identify the first accurate description of red blood cells and discovered bacteria after gaining interest in the sense of taste that resulted in Leeuwenhoek to observe the tongue of an ox, then leading him to study "pepper water" in 1676. He also found for the first time the sperm cells of animals and humans. Once discovering these types of cells, Leeuwenhoek saw that the fertilization process requires the sperm cell to enter the egg cell. This put an end to the previous theory of spontaneous generation. After reading letters by Leeuwenhoek, Hooke was the first to confirm his observations that were thought to be unlikely by other contemporaries.

Cells in animal tissues were observed later than those in plants because their tissues are fragile and difficult to study. Biologists believed that there was a fundamental unit to life, but until Henri Dutrochet were unclear what it was. Besides stating “the cell is the fundamental element of organization”, Dutrochet claimed that cells were also a physiological unit.

In 1804, Karl Rudolphi and J. H. F. Link were awarded the prize for "solving the problem of the nature of cells", meaning they were the first to prove that cells had independent cell walls by the Königliche Societät der Wissenschaft (Royal Society of Science), Göttingen. Before, it had been thought that cells shared walls and the fluid passed between them this way.

== Cell theory ==
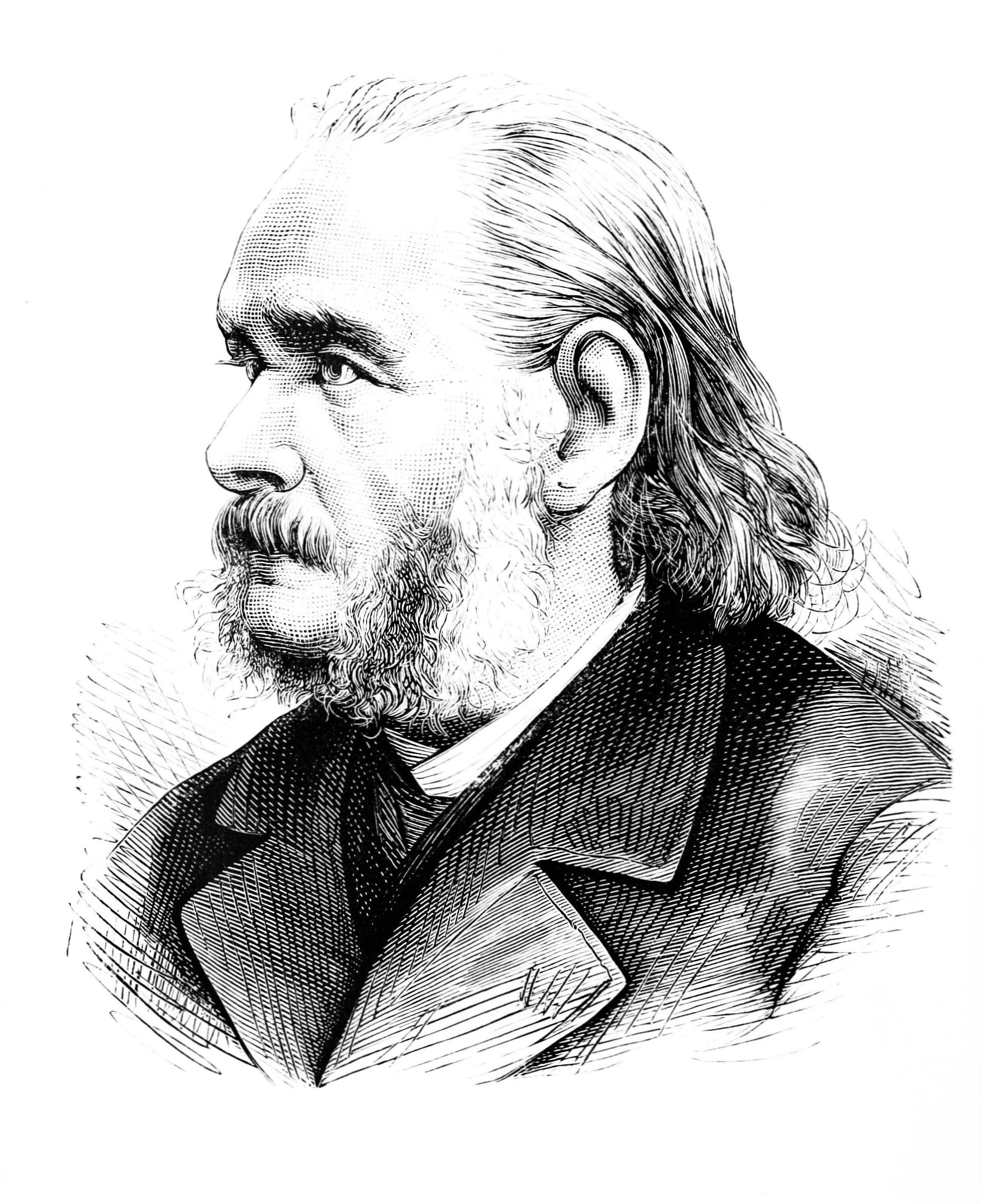
Matthias Jakob Schleiden (1804–1881)

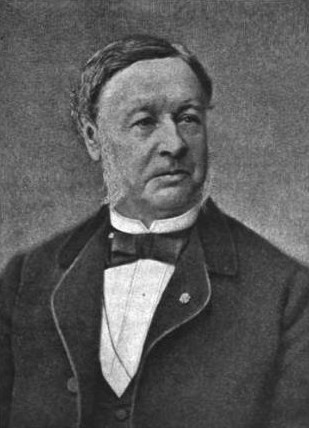
Theodor Schwann (1810–1882)

Credit for developing cell theory is usually given to two scientists: Theodor Schwann and Matthias Jakob Schleiden. While Rudolf Virchow contributed to the theory, he is not as credited for his attributions toward it. In 1839, Schleiden suggested that every structural part of a plant was made up of cells or the result of cells. He also suggested that cells were made by a crystallization process either within other cells or from the outside. However, this was not an original idea of Schleiden. He claimed this theory as his own, though Barthelemy Dumortier had stated it years before him. This crystallization process is no longer accepted with modern cell theory. In 1839, Theodor Schwann stated that along with plants, animals are composed of cells or the product of cells in their structures. This was a major advance in the field of biology since little was known about animal structure up to this point compared to plants. From these conclusions about plants and animals, two of the three tenets of cell theory were postulated.

1. All living organisms are composed of one or more cells
2. The cell is the most basic unit of life

Schleiden's theory of free cell formation through crystallization was refuted in the 1850s by Robert Remak, Rudolf Virchow, and Albert Kolliker. In 1855, Rudolf Virchow added the third tenet to cell theory. In Latin, this tenet states Omnis cellula e cellula. This translated to:

3. All cells arise only from pre-existing cells

However, the idea that all cells come from pre-existing cells had already been proposed by Robert Remak; it has been suggested that Virchow plagiarized Remak. Remak published observations in 1852 on cell division, claiming Schleiden and Schwann were incorrect about generation schemes. He instead said that binary fission, which was first introduced by Dumortier, was how reproduction of new animal cells were made. Once this tenet was added, classical cell theory was complete.

== Modern interpretation ==
The generally accepted parts of modern cell theory include:

1. All known living things are made up of one or more cells
2. All living cells arise from pre-existing cells by division.
3. The cell is the fundamental unit of structure and function in all living organisms.
4. The activity of an organism depends on the total activity of independent cells.
5. Energy flow (metabolism and biochemistry) occurs within cells.
6. Cells contain DNA which is found specifically in the chromosome and RNA found in the cell nucleus and cytoplasm.
7. All cells are basically the same in chemical composition in organisms of similar species.

== Opposing concepts ==
The cell was first discovered by Robert Hooke in 1665 using a microscope. The first cell theory is credited to the work of Theodor Schwann and Matthias Jakob Schleiden in the 1830s. In this theory the internal contents of cells were called protoplasm and described as a jelly-like substance, sometimes called living jelly. At about the same time, colloidal chemistry began its development, and the concepts of bound water emerged. A colloid being something between a solution and a suspension, where Brownian motion is sufficient to prevent sedimentation. The idea of a semipermeable membrane, a barrier that is permeable to solvent but impermeable to solute molecules was developed at about the same time. The term osmosis originated in 1827 and its importance to physiological phenomena realized, but it wasn’t until 1877, when the botanist Pfeffer proposed the membrane theory of cell physiology. In this view, the cell was seen to be enclosed by a thin surface, the plasma membrane, and cell water and solutes such as a potassium ion existed in a physical state like that of a dilute solution. In 1889 Hamburger used hemolysis of erythrocytes to determine the permeability of various solutes. By measuring the time required for the cells to swell past their elastic limit, the rate at which solutes entered the cells could be estimated by the accompanying change in cell volume. He also found that there was an apparent nonsolvent volume of about 50% in red blood cells and later showed that this includes water of hydration in addition to the protein and other nonsolvent components of the cells.

=== Membrane and bulk phase theories ===
Two opposing concepts developed within the context of studies on osmosis, permeability, and electrical properties of cells. The first held that these properties all belonged to the plasma membrane whereas the other predominant view was that the protoplasm was responsible for these properties. The membrane theory developed as a succession of ad-hoc additions and changes to the theory to overcome experimental hurdles. Overton (a distant cousin of Charles Darwin) first proposed the concept of a lipid (oil) plasma membrane in 1899. The major weakness of the lipid membrane was the lack of an explanation of the high permeability to water, so Nathansohn (1904) proposed the mosaic theory. In this view, the membrane is not a pure lipid layer, but a mosaic of areas with lipid and areas with semipermeable gel. Ruhland refined the mosaic theory to include pores to allow additional passage of small molecules. Since membranes are generally less permeable to anions, Leonor Michaelis concluded that ions are adsorbed to the walls of the pores, changing the permeability of the pores to ions by electrostatic repulsion. Michaelis demonstrated the membrane potential (1926) and proposed that it was related to the distribution of ions across the membrane.

Harvey and Danielli (1939) proposed a lipid bilayer membrane covered on each side with a layer of protein to account for measurements of surface tension. In 1941 Boyle and Conway showed that the membrane of frog muscle was permeable to both K^{+} and Cl^{−}, but apparently not to Na^{+}, so the idea of electrical charges in the pores was unnecessary since a single critical pore size would explain the permeability to K^{+}, H^{+}, and Cl^{−} as well as the impermeability to Na^{+}, Ca^{+}, and Mg^{2+}. Over the same time period, it was shown (Procter and Wilson, 1916) that gels, which do not have a semipermeable membrane, would swell in dilute solutions.

Jacques Loeb (1920) also studied gelatin extensively, with and without a membrane, showing that more of the properties attributed to the plasma membrane could be duplicated in gels without a membrane. In particular, he found that an electrical potential difference between the gelatin and the outside medium could be developed, based on the H^{+} concentration. Some criticisms of the membrane theory developed in the 1930s, based on observations such as the ability of some cells to swell and increase their surface area by a factor of 1000. A lipid layer cannot stretch to that extent without becoming a patchwork (thereby losing its barrier properties). Such criticisms stimulated continued studies on protoplasm as the principal agent determining cell permeability properties.

In 1938, Fischer and Suer proposed that water in the protoplasm is not free but in a chemically combined form—the protoplasm represents a combination of protein, salt and water—and demonstrated the basic similarity between swelling in living tissues and the swelling of gelatin and fibrin gels. Dimitri Nasonov (1944) viewed proteins as the central components responsible for many properties of the cell, including electrical properties. By the 1940s, the bulk phase theories were not as well developed as the membrane theories. In 1941, Brooks and Brooks published a monograph, "The Permeability of Living Cells", which rejects the bulk phase theories.

=== Steady-state membrane pump concept ===
With the development of radioactive tracers, it was shown that cells are not impermeable to Na^{+}. This was difficult to explain with the membrane barrier theory, so the sodium pump was proposed to continually remove Na^{+} as it permeates cells. This drove the concept that cells are in a state of dynamic equilibrium, constantly using energy to maintain ion gradients. In 1935, Karl Lohmann discovered ATP and its role as a source of energy for cells, so the concept of a metabolically-driven sodium pump was proposed. The success of Hodgkin, Huxley, and Katz in the development of the membrane theory of cellular membrane potentials, with differential equations that modeled the phenomena correctly, provided further support for the membrane pump hypothesis.

The modern consensus describes the plasma membrane as a fluid lipid bilayer with embedded and associated proteins, following the fluid mosaic model proposed by Singer and Nicolson in 1972. High-resolution structures of many membrane proteins have since been determined, and the membrane theory of cell physiology, in which the membrane and its ion pumps maintain the resting potential and intracellular ion gradients, is accepted by the great majority of physiologists. A small number of dissenters, associated chiefly with Gilbert Ling's association-induction hypothesis and related bulk-phase theories, instead argue that intracellular potassium and water are organized by adsorption to cellular proteins rather than retained by a pumping membrane. These views remain outside the scientific mainstream.

=== Reemergence of bulk phase theories ===
In 1956, Afanasy S. Troshin published a book, The Problems of Cell Permeability, in Russian, in which he showed that permeability was of secondary importance in determining the patterns of equilibrium between the cell and its environment. Troshin showed that cell water decreased in solutions of galactose or urea although these compounds did slowly permeate cells. Since the membrane theory requires an impermanent solute to sustain cell shrinkage, these experiments cast doubt on the theory. Others questioned whether the cell has enough energy to sustain the sodium/potassium pump. Such questions became even more urgent as dozens of new metabolic pumps were added as new chemical gradients were discovered.

In 1962, Gilbert Ling became the champion of the bulk phase theories and proposed his association-induction hypothesis of living cells.

== See also ==
- Cell adhesion
- Cytoskeleton
- Cell biology
- Cellular differentiation
- Germ theory of disease
- Membrane models

== Bibliography ==
- Tavassoli, M. (1980). "The cell theory: a foundation to the edifice of biology". American Journal of Pathology. 98 (1): 44. PMC 1903404. PMID 6985772.
- Turner, W. (January 1890). "The Cell Theory Past and Present". Journal of Anatomy and Physiology. 24 (Pt 2): 253–87. PMC 1328050. PMID 17231856.
- Wolfe, Stephen L. (1972). Biology of the cell. Wadsworth Pub. Co. ISBN 978-0-534-00106-3.
