= Cell membrane =

Biological membrane that separates the interior of a cell from its outside environment

Illustration of a eukaryotic cell membrane

Comparison of a eukaryote and a prokaryote.

The cell membrane (also known as the plasma membrane or cytoplasmic membrane, and historically referred to as the plasmalemma) is a semipermeable biological membrane that separates and protects the interior of a cell from the outside environment (the extracellular space). The cell membrane is a lipid bilayer, usually consisting of phospholipids and glycolipids; eukaryotes and some archaea typically have sterols (such as cholesterol in animals) interspersed between them as well, maintaining appropriate membrane fluidity at various temperatures. The membrane also contains membrane proteins, including integral proteins that span the membrane and serve as transporters, and peripheral proteins that attach to the surface of the cell membrane, acting as enzymes to facilitate interaction with the cell's environment. Glycolipids embedded in the outer lipid layer serve a similar purpose.

The cell membrane controls the movement of substances in and out of a cell, being selectively permeable to ions and organic molecules. In addition, cell membranes are involved in a variety of cellular processes such as cell adhesion, ion conductivity, and cell signaling and serve as the attachment surface for several extracellular structures, including the cell wall and the carbohydrate cell coat called the glycocalyx, as well as the intracellular network of protein fibers called the cytoskeleton. In the field of synthetic biology, cell membranes can be artificially reassembled.

== History ==
Robert Hooke's discovery of cells in 1665 led to the proposal of the cell theory. Initially it was believed that all cells contained a hard cell wall since only plant cells could be observed at the time. Microscopists focused on the cell wall for well over 150 years until advances in microscopy were made. In the early 19th century, cells were recognized as being separate entities, unconnected, and bound by individual cell walls after it was found that plant cells could be separated. This theory extended to include animal cells to suggest a universal mechanism for cell protection and development.

By the second half of the 19th century, microscopy was still not advanced enough to make a distinction between cell membranes and cell walls. However, some microscopists correctly identified at this time that while invisible, it could be inferred that cell membranes existed in animal cells due to intracellular movement of components internally but not externally and that membranes were not the equivalent of a plant cell wall. It was also inferred that cell membranes were not vital components to all cells. Many refuted the existence of a cell membrane still towards the end of the 19th century. In 1890, a revision to the cell theory stated that cell membranes existed, but were merely secondary structures. It was not until later studies with osmosis and permeability that cell membranes gained more recognition. In 1895, Ernest Overton proposed that cell membranes were made of lipids.

The lipid bilayer hypothesis, proposed in 1925 by Gorter and Grendel, created speculation in the description of the cell membrane bilayer structure based on crystallographic studies and soap bubble observations. In an attempt to accept or reject the hypothesis, researchers measured membrane thickness. These researchers extracted the lipid from human red blood cells and measured the amount of surface area the lipid would cover when spread over the surface of the water. Since mature mammalian red blood cells lack both nuclei and cytoplasmic organelles, the plasma membrane is the only lipid-containing structure in the cell. Consequently, all of the lipids extracted from the cells can be assumed to have resided in the cells' plasma membranes. The ratio of the surface area of water covered by the extracted lipid to the surface area calculated for the red blood cells from which the lipid was 2:1(approx) and they concluded that the plasma membrane contains a lipid bilayer.

In 1925 it was determined by Fricke that the thickness of erythrocyte and yeast cell membranes ranged between 3.3 and 4 nm, a thickness compatible with a lipid monolayer. The choice of the dielectric constant used in these studies was called into question but future tests could not disprove the results of the initial experiment. Independently, the leptoscope was invented in order to measure very thin membranes by comparing the intensity of light reflected from a sample to the intensity of a membrane standard of known thickness. The instrument could resolve thicknesses that depended on pH measurements and the presence of membrane proteins that ranged from 8.6 to 23.2 nm, with the lower measurements supporting the lipid bilayer hypothesis. Later in the 1930s, the membrane structure model developed in general agreement to be the paucimolecular model of Davson and Danielli (1935). This model was based on studies of surface tension between oils and echinoderm eggs. Since the surface tension values appeared to be much lower than would be expected for an oil–water interface, it was assumed that some substance was responsible for lowering the interfacial tensions in the surface of cells. It was suggested that a lipid bilayer was in between two thin protein layers. The paucimolecular model immediately became popular and it dominated cell membrane studies for the following 30 years, until it became rivaled by the fluid mosaic model of Singer and Nicolson (1972).

Despite the numerous models of the cell membrane proposed prior to the fluid mosaic model, it remains the primary archetype for the cell membrane long after its inception in the 1970s. Although the fluid mosaic model has been modernized to detail contemporary discoveries, the basics have remained constant: the membrane is a lipid bilayer composed of hydrophilic exterior heads and a hydrophobic interior where proteins can interact with hydrophilic heads through polar interactions, but proteins that span the bilayer fully or partially have hydrophobic amino acids that interact with the non-polar lipid interior. The fluid mosaic model not only provided an accurate representation of membrane mechanics, it enhanced the study of hydrophobic forces, which would later develop into an essential descriptive limitation to describe biological macromolecules.

For many centuries, the scientists cited disagreed with the significance of the structure they were seeing as the cell membrane. For almost two centuries, the membranes were seen but mostly disregarded as an important structure with cellular function. It was not until the 20th century that the significance of the cell membrane as it was acknowledged. Finally, two scientists Gorter and Grendel (1925) made the discovery that the membrane is "lipid-based". From this, they furthered the idea that this structure would have to be in a formation that mimicked layers. Once studied further, it was found by comparing the sum of the cell surfaces and the surfaces of the lipids, a 2:1 ratio was estimated; thus, providing the first basis of the bilayer structure known today. This discovery initiated many new studies that arose globally within various fields of scientific studies, confirming that the structure and functions of the cell membrane are widely accepted.

The structure has been variously referred to by different writers as the ectoplast (de Vries, 1885), Plasmahaut (plasma skin, Pfeffer, 1877, 1891), Hautschicht (skin layer, Pfeffer, 1886; used with a different meaning by Hofmeister, 1867), plasmatic membrane (Pfeffer, 1900), plasma membrane, cytoplasmic membrane, cell envelope and cell membrane. Some authors who did not believe that there was a functional permeable boundary at the surface of the cell preferred to use the term plasmalemma (coined by Mast, 1924) for the external region of the cell.

== Composition ==
Cell membranes contain a variety of biological molecules, notably lipids and proteins. Composition is not set, but constantly changing for fluidity and changes in the environment, even fluctuating during different stages of cell development. Specifically, the amount of cholesterol in human primary neuron cell membrane changes, and this change in composition affects fluidity throughout development stages.

Material is incorporated into the membrane, or deleted from it, by a variety of mechanisms:

- Fusion of intracellular vesicles with the membrane (exocytosis) not only excretes the contents of the vesicle but also incorporates the vesicle membrane's components into the cell membrane. The membrane may form blebs around extracellular material that pinch off to become vesicles (endocytosis).
- If a membrane is continuous with a tubular structure made of membrane material, then material from the tube can be drawn into the membrane continuously.
- Although the concentration of membrane components in the aqueous phase is low (stable membrane components have low solubility in water), there is an exchange of molecules between the lipid and aqueous phases.

=== Lipids ===
Examples of the major membrane phospholipids and glycolipids: phosphatidylcholine (PtdCho), phosphatidylethanolamine (PtdEtn), phosphatidylinositol (PtdIns), phosphatidylserine (PtdSer).

The cell membrane consists of three classes of amphipathic lipids: phospholipids, glycolipids, and sterols. The amount of each depends upon the type of cell, but in the majority of cases phospholipids are the most abundant, often contributing for over 50% of all lipids in plasma membranes. Glycolipids only account for a minute amount of about 2% and sterols make up the rest. In red blood cell studies, 30% of the plasma membrane is lipid. However, for the majority of eukaryotic cells, the composition of plasma membranes is about half lipids and half proteins by weight.

The fatty chains in phospholipids and glycolipids usually contain an even number of carbon atoms, typically between 16 and 20. The 16- and 18-carbon fatty acids are the most common. Fatty acids may be saturated or unsaturated, with the configuration of the double bonds nearly always "cis". The length and the degree of unsaturation of fatty acid chains have a profound effect on membrane fluidity as unsaturated lipids create a kink, preventing the fatty acids from packing together as tightly, thus decreasing the melting temperature (increasing the fluidity) of the membrane. The ability of some organisms to regulate the fluidity of their cell membranes by altering lipid composition is called homeoviscous adaptation.

The entire membrane is held together via non-covalent interaction of hydrophobic tails, however the structure is quite fluid and not fixed rigidly in place. Under physiological conditions phospholipid molecules in the cell membrane are in the liquid crystalline state. It means the lipid molecules are free to diffuse and exhibit rapid lateral diffusion along the layer in which they are present. However, the exchange of phospholipid molecules between intracellular and extracellular leaflets of the bilayer is a very slow process. Lipid rafts and caveolae are examples of cholesterol-enriched microdomains in the cell membrane. Also, a fraction of the lipid in direct contact with integral membrane proteins, which is tightly bound to the protein surface is called annular lipid shell; it behaves as a part of protein complex.

Cholesterol is normally found dispersed in varying degrees throughout cell membranes, in the irregular spaces between the hydrophobic tails of the membrane lipids, where it confers a stiffening and strengthening effect on the membrane. Additionally, the amount of cholesterol in biological membranes varies between organisms, cell types, and even in individual cells. Cholesterol, a major component of plasma membranes, regulates the fluidity of the overall membrane, meaning that cholesterol controls the amount of movement of the various cell membrane components based on its concentrations. In high temperatures, cholesterol inhibits the movement of phospholipid fatty acid chains, causing a reduced permeability to small molecules and reduced membrane fluidity. The opposite is true for the role of cholesterol in cooler temperatures. Cholesterol production, and thus concentration, is up-regulated (increased) in response to cold temperature. At cold temperatures, cholesterol interferes with fatty acid chain interactions. Acting as antifreeze, cholesterol maintains the fluidity of the membrane. Cholesterol is more abundant in cold-weather animals than warm-weather animals. In plants, which lack cholesterol, other related sterol compounds perform the same function as cholesterol.

=== Phospholipids forming lipid vesicles ===
Lipid vesicles or liposomes are approximately spherical pockets that are enclosed by a lipid bilayer. These structures are used in laboratories to study the effects of chemicals in cells by delivering these chemicals directly to the cell, as well as getting more insight into cell membrane permeability. Lipid vesicles and liposomes are formed by first suspending a lipid in an aqueous solution then agitating the mixture through sonication, resulting in a vesicle. Measuring the rate of efflux from the inside of the vesicle to the ambient solution allows researchers to better understand membrane permeability. Vesicles can be formed with molecules and ions inside the vesicle by forming the vesicle with the desired molecule or ion present in the solution. Proteins can also be embedded into the membrane through solubilizing the desired proteins in the presence of detergents and attaching them to the phospholipids in which the liposome is formed. These provide researchers with a tool to examine various membrane protein functions.

=== Carbohydrates ===
Plasma membranes also contain carbohydrates, predominantly glycoproteins, but with some glycolipids (cerebrosides and gangliosides). Carbohydrates are important in the role of cell-cell recognition in eukaryotes; they are located on the surface of the cell where they recognize host cells and share information. Viruses that bind to cells using these receptors cause an infection. For the most part, no glycosylation occurs on membranes within the cell; rather generally glycosylation occurs on the extracellular surface of the plasma membrane. The glycocalyx is an important feature in all cells, especially epithelia with microvilli. Recent data suggest the glycocalyx participates in cell adhesion, lymphocyte homing, and many others. The penultimate sugar is galactose and the terminal sugar is sialic acid, as the sugar backbone is modified in the Golgi apparatus. Sialic acid carries a negative charge, providing an external barrier to charged particles.

=== Proteins ===
Type	Description	Examples
Integral proteins or transmembrane proteins	Span the membrane and have a hydrophilic cytosolic domain, which interacts with internal molecules, a hydrophobic membrane-spanning domain that anchors it within the cell membrane, and a hydrophilic extracellular domain that interacts with external molecules. The hydrophobic domain consists of one, multiple, or a combination of α-helices and β sheet protein motifs.	Ion channels, proton pumps, G protein-coupled receptor
Lipid anchored proteins	Covalently bound to single or multiple lipid molecules; hydrophobically insert into the cell membrane and anchor the protein. The protein itself is not in contact with the membrane.	G proteins
Peripheral proteins	Attached to integral membrane proteins, or associated with peripheral regions of the lipid bilayer. These proteins tend to have only temporary interactions with biological membranes, and once reacted, the molecule dissociates to carry on its work in the cytoplasm.	Some enzymes, some hormones

The cell membrane has large content of proteins, typically around 50% of membrane volume These proteins are important for the cell because they are responsible for various biological activities. Approximately a third of the genes in yeast code specifically for them, and this number is even higher in multicellular organisms. Membrane proteins consist of three main types: integral proteins, peripheral proteins, and lipid-anchored proteins.

As shown in the adjacent table, integral proteins are amphipathic transmembrane proteins. Examples of integral proteins include ion channels, proton pumps, and g-protein coupled receptors. Ion channels allow inorganic ions such as sodium, potassium, calcium, or chlorine to diffuse down their electrochemical gradient across the lipid bilayer through hydrophilic pores across the membrane. The electrical behavior of cells (i.e. nerve cells) is controlled by ion channels. Proton pumps are protein pumps that are embedded in the lipid bilayer that allow protons to travel through the membrane by transferring from one amino acid side chain to another. Processes such as electron transport and generating ATP use proton pumps. A G-protein coupled receptor is a single polypeptide chain that crosses the lipid bilayer seven times responding to signal molecules (i.e. hormones and neurotransmitters). G-protein coupled receptors are used in processes such as cell to cell signaling, the regulation of the production of cAMP, and the regulation of ion channels.

The cell membrane, being exposed to the outside environment, is an important site of cell–cell communication. As such, a large variety of protein receptors and identification proteins, such as antigens, are present on the surface of the membrane. Functions of membrane proteins can also include cell–cell contact, surface recognition, cytoskeleton contact, signaling, enzymatic activity, or transporting substances across the membrane.

Most membrane proteins must be inserted in some way into the membrane. For this to occur, an N-terminus "signal sequence" of amino acids directs proteins to the endoplasmic reticulum, which inserts the proteins into a lipid bilayer. Once inserted, the proteins are then transported to their final destination in vesicles, where the vesicle fuses with the target membrane.

== Function ==
A detailed diagram of the cell membrane

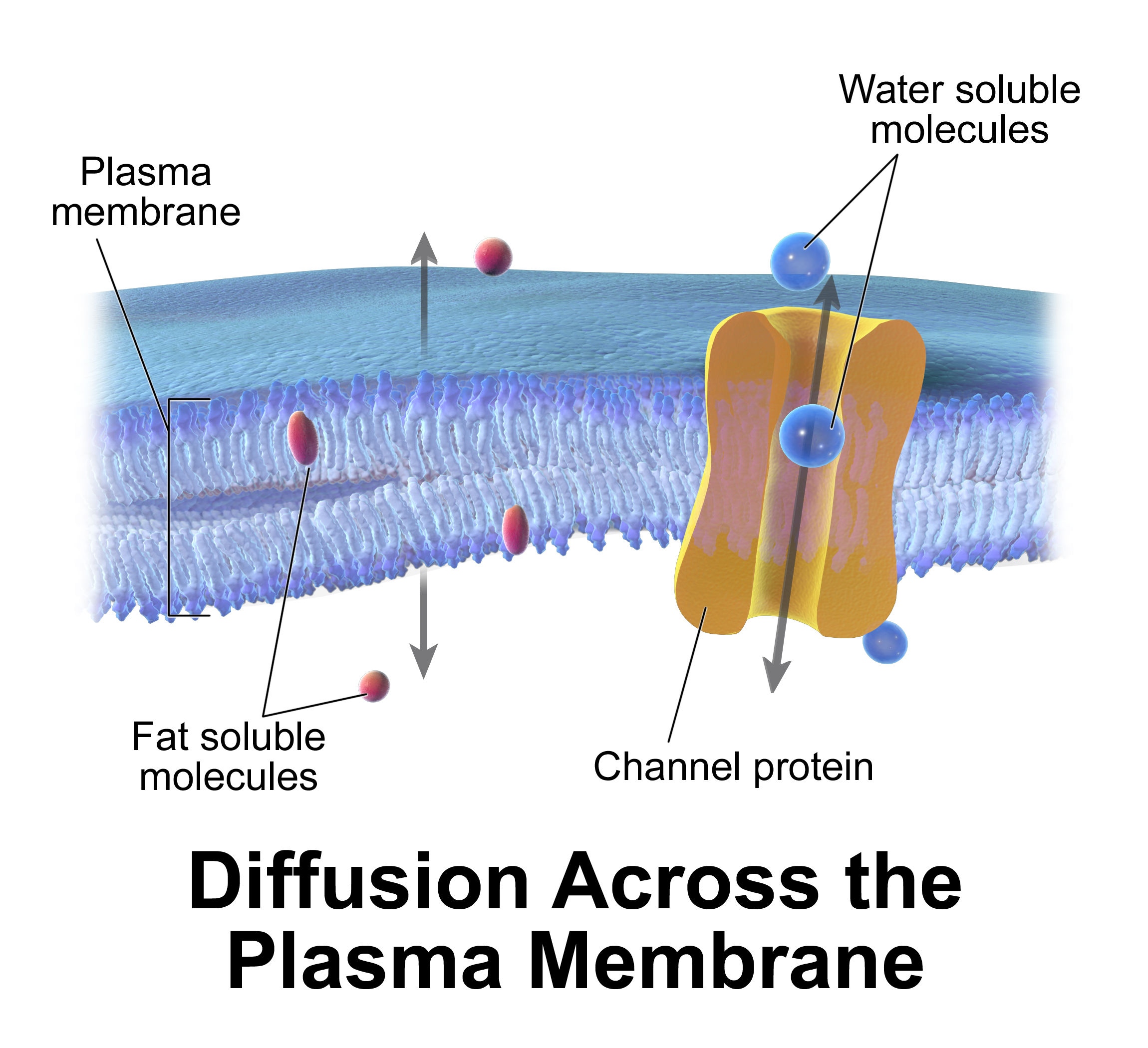
Illustration depicting cellular diffusion

The cell membrane surrounds the cytoplasm of living cells, physically separating the intracellular components from the extracellular environment. The cell membrane also plays a role in anchoring the cytoskeleton to provide shape to the cell, and in attaching to the extracellular matrix and other cells to hold them together to form tissues. Fungi, bacteria, most archaea, and plants also have a cell wall, which provides a mechanical support to the cell and precludes the passage of larger molecules.

The cell membrane is selectively permeable and able to regulate what enters and exits the cell, thus facilitating the transport of materials needed for survival. The movement of substances across the membrane can be achieved by either passive transport, occurring without the input of cellular energy, or by active transport, requiring the cell to expend energy in transporting it. The membrane also maintains the cell potential. The cell membrane thus works as a selective filter that allows only certain things to come inside or go outside the cell. The cell employs a number of transport mechanisms that involve biological membranes:

1. Passive osmosis and diffusion: Some substances (small molecules, ions) such as carbon dioxide (CO_{2}) and oxygen (O_{2}), can move across the plasma membrane by diffusion, which is a passive transport process. Because the membrane acts as a barrier for certain molecules and ions, they can occur in different concentrations on the two sides of the membrane. Diffusion occurs when small molecules and ions move freely from high concentration to low concentration in order to equilibrate the membrane. It is considered a passive transport process because it does not require energy and is propelled by the concentration gradient created by each side of the membrane. Such a concentration gradient across a semipermeable membrane sets up an osmotic flow for the water. Osmosis, in biological systems involves a solvent, moving through a semipermeable membrane similarly to passive diffusion as the solvent still moves with the concentration gradient and requires no energy. While water is the most common solvent in cell, it can also be other liquids as well as supercritical liquids and gases.
2. Transmembrane protein channels and transporters: Transmembrane proteins extend through the lipid bilayer of the membranes; they function on both sides of the membrane to transport molecules across it. Nutrients, such as sugars or amino acids, must enter the cell, and certain products of metabolism must leave the cell. Such molecules can diffuse passively through protein channels such as aquaporins in facilitated diffusion or are pumped across the membrane by transmembrane transporters. Protein channel proteins, also called permeases, are usually quite specific, and they only recognize and transport a limited variety of chemical substances, often limited to a single substance. Another example of a transmembrane protein is a cell-surface receptor, which allow cell signaling molecules to communicate between cells.
3. Endocytosis: Endocytosis is the process in which cells absorb molecules by engulfing them. The plasma membrane creates a small deformation inward, called an invagination, in which the substance to be transported is captured. This invagination is caused by proteins on the outside on the cell membrane, acting as receptors and clustering into depressions that eventually promote accumulation of more proteins and lipids on the cytosolic side of the membrane. The deformation then pinches off from the membrane on the inside of the cell, creating a vesicle containing the captured substance. Endocytosis is a pathway for internalizing solid particles ("cell eating" or phagocytosis), small molecules and ions ("cell drinking" or pinocytosis), and macromolecules. Endocytosis requires energy and is thus a form of active transport.
4. Exocytosis: Just as material can be brought into the cell by invagination and formation of a vesicle, the membrane of a vesicle can be fused with the plasma membrane, extruding its contents to the surrounding medium. This is the process of exocytosis. Exocytosis occurs in various cells to remove undigested residues of substances brought in by endocytosis, to secrete substances such as hormones and enzymes, and to transport a substance completely across a cellular barrier. In the process of exocytosis, the undigested waste-containing food vacuole or the secretory vesicle budded from Golgi apparatus, is first moved by cytoskeleton from the interior of the cell to the surface. The vesicle membrane comes in contact with the plasma membrane. The lipid molecules of the two bilayers rearrange themselves and the two membranes are, thus, fused. A passage is formed in the fused membrane and the vesicle discharges its contents outside the cell.

== Prokaryotes ==
Prokaryotes are divided into two different groups: Archaea and Bacteria, with bacteria dividing further into gram-positive and gram-negative. Gram-negative bacteria have both a plasma membrane and an outer membrane separated by periplasm; however, other prokaryotes have only a plasma membrane. These two membranes differ in many aspects. The outer membrane of the gram-negative bacteria differs from other prokaryotes due to lipopolysaccharides forming the exterior of the bilayer, and lipoproteins and phospholipids forming the interior. The outer membrane typically has a porous quality due to membrane proteins such as porins, which are pore-forming proteins. The inner plasma membrane is also generally symmetric, whereas the outer membrane is asymmetric because of proteins such as the aforementioned.

Also, for the prokaryotic membranes, there are multiple things that can affect the fluidity. One of the major factors that can affect the fluidity is fatty acid composition. For example, when Staphylococcus aureus was grown at 37 °C for 24 h, the membrane exhibited a more fluid state instead of a gel-like state. This supports the concept that in higher temperatures, the membrane is more fluid than in colder temperatures. When the membrane is becoming more fluid and needs to become more stabilized, it will make longer fatty acid chains or saturated fatty acid chains in order to help stabilize the membrane.

Bacteria are also surrounded by a cell wall composed of peptidoglycan (amino acids and sugars). Some eukaryotic cells also have cell walls, but none that are made of peptidoglycan. The outer membrane of gram negative bacteria is rich in lipopolysaccharides, which are combined poly- or oligosaccharide and saccharolipid that stimulate the cell's natural immunity. The outer membrane can bleb out into periplasmic protrusions under stress conditions or upon virulence requirements while encountering a host target cell, and thus such blebs may work as virulence organelles. Bacterial cells provide numerous examples of the diverse ways in which prokaryotic cell membranes are adapted with structures that suit the organism's niche. For example, proteins on the surface of certain bacterial cells aid in their gliding motion. Many gram-negative bacteria have cell membranes which contain ATP-driven protein exporting systems.

== Structures ==
=== Fluid mosaic model ===
According to the fluid mosaic model of S. J. Singer and G. L. Nicolson (1972), which replaced the earlier model of Davson and Danielli, biological membranes can be considered as a two-dimensional liquid in which lipid and protein molecules diffuse more or less easily. Although the lipid bilayers that form the basis of the membranes do indeed form two-dimensional liquids by themselves, the plasma membrane also contains a large quantity of proteins, which provide more structure. Examples of such structures are protein-protein complexes, pickets and fences formed by the actin-based cytoskeleton, and potentially lipid rafts.

=== Lipid bilayer ===
Diagram of the arrangement of amphipathic lipid molecules to form a lipid bilayer. The yellow polar head groups separate the grey hydrophobic tails from the aqueous cytosolic and extracellular environments.

Lipid bilayers form through the process of self-assembly. The cell membrane consists primarily of a thin layer of amphipathic phospholipids that spontaneously arrange so that the hydrophobic "tail" regions are isolated from the surrounding water while the hydrophilic "head" regions interact with the intracellular (cytosolic) and extracellular faces of the resulting bilayer. This forms a continuous, spherical lipid bilayer. Hydrophobic interactions (also known as the hydrophobic effect) are the major driving forces in the formation of lipid bilayers. An increase in interactions between hydrophobic molecules (causing clustering of hydrophobic regions) allows water molecules to bond more freely with each other, increasing the entropy of the system. This complex interaction can include noncovalent interactions such as van der Waals, electrostatic and hydrogen bonds.

Lipid bilayers are generally impermeable to ions and polar molecules. The arrangement of hydrophilic heads and hydrophobic tails of the lipid bilayer prevents polar solutes (ex. amino acids, nucleic acids, carbohydrates, proteins, and ions) from diffusing across the membrane, but generally allows for the passive diffusion of hydrophobic molecules. This affords the cell the ability to control the movement of these substances via transmembrane protein complexes such as pores, channels and gates. Flippases and scramblases concentrate phosphatidyl serine, which carries a negative charge, on the inner membrane. Along with NANA, this creates an extra barrier to charged moieties moving through the membrane.

Membranes serve diverse functions in eukaryotic and prokaryotic cells. One important role is to regulate the movement of materials into and out of cells. The phospholipid bilayer structure (fluid mosaic model) with specific membrane proteins accounts for the selective permeability of the membrane and passive and active transport mechanisms. In addition, membranes in prokaryotes and in the mitochondria and chloroplasts of eukaryotes facilitate the synthesis of ATP through chemiosmosis.

=== Membrane polarity ===
Alpha intercalated cell

The apical membrane or luminal membrane of a polarized cell is the surface of the plasma membrane that faces inward to the lumen. This is particularly evident in epithelial and endothelial cells, but also describes other polarized cells, such as neurons. The basolateral membrane or basolateral cell membrane of a polarized cell is the surface of the plasma membrane that forms its basal and lateral surfaces. It faces outwards, towards the interstitium, and away from the lumen. Basolateral membrane is a compound phrase referring to the terms "basal (base) membrane" and "lateral (side) membrane", which, especially in epithelial cells, are identical in composition and activity. Proteins (such as ion channels and pumps) are free to move from the basal to the lateral surface of the cell or vice versa in accordance with the fluid mosaic model. Tight junctions join epithelial cells near their apical surface to prevent the migration of proteins from the basolateral membrane to the apical membrane. The basal and lateral surfaces thus remain roughly equivalent to one another, yet distinct from the apical surface.

=== Membrane structures ===
Diagram of the cell membrane's structures

The cell membrane can form different types of "supramembrane" structures such as caveolae, postsynaptic densities, podosomes, invadopodia, focal adhesions, and different types of cell junction. These structures are usually responsible for cell adhesion, communication, endocytosis and exocytosis. They are composed of specific proteins, such as integrins and cadherins. They can be visualized by electron microscopy or fluorescence microscopy.

=== Cytoskeleton ===
The cytoskeleton is found underlying the cell membrane in the cytoplasm and provides a scaffolding for membrane proteins to anchor to, as well as forming organelles that extend from the cell. Indeed, cytoskeletal elements interact extensively and intimately with the cell membrane. Anchoring proteins restricts them to a particular cell surface—for example, the apical surface of epithelial cells that line the vertebrate gut—and limits how far they may diffuse within the bilayer. The cytoskeleton is able to form appendage-like organelles, such as cilia, which are microtubule-based extensions covered by the cell membrane, and filopodia, which are actin-based extensions. These extensions are ensheathed in membrane and project from the surface of the cell in order to sense the external environment and/or make contact with the substrate or other cells. The apical surfaces of epithelial cells are dense with actin-based finger-like projections known as microvilli, which increase cell surface area and thereby increase the absorption rate of nutrients. Localized decoupling of the cytoskeleton and cell membrane results in formation of a bleb.

=== Intracellular membranes ===
The content of the cell, inside the cell membrane, is composed of numerous membrane-bound organelles, which contribute to the overall function of the cell. The origin, structure, and function of each organelle leads to a large variation in the cell composition due to the individual uniqueness associated with each organelle.

- Mitochondria and chloroplasts are considered to have evolved from bacteria, known as the endosymbiotic theory. This theory arose from the idea that Paracoccus and Rhodopseudomonas, types of bacteria, share similar functions to mitochondria and blue-green algae (cyanobacteria) share similar functions to chloroplasts. Endosymbiotic theory proposes that through the course of evolution, a eukaryotic cell engulfed these two types of bacteria, leading to the formation of mitochondria and chloroplasts inside eukaryotic cells. This engulfment lead to the double-membranes systems of these organelles in which the outer membrane originated from the host's plasma membrane and the inner membrane was the endosymbiont's plasma membrane. Considering that mitochondria and chloroplasts both contain their own DNA is further support that both of these organelles evolved from engulfed bacteria that thrived inside a eukaryotic cell.
- In eukaryotic cells, the nuclear membrane separates the contents of the nucleus from the cytoplasm of the cell. The nuclear membrane is formed by an inner and outer membrane, providing the strict regulation of materials in to and out of the nucleus. Materials move between the cytosol and the nucleus through nuclear pores in the nuclear membrane. If a cell's nucleus is more active in transcription, its membrane will have more pores. The protein composition of the nucleus can vary greatly from the cytosol as many proteins are unable to cross through pores via diffusion. Within the nuclear membrane, the inner and outer membranes vary in protein composition, and only the outer membrane is continuous with the endoplasmic reticulum (ER) membrane. Like the ER, the outer membrane also possesses ribosomes responsible for producing and transporting proteins into the space between the two membranes. The nuclear membrane disassembles during the early stages of mitosis and reassembles in later stages of mitosis.
- The ER is part of the endomembrane system, which makes up a very large portion of the cell's total membrane content. The ER is an enclosed network of tubules and sacs, and its main functions include protein synthesis, and lipid metabolism. There are 2 types of ER, smooth and rough. The rough ER has ribosomes attached to it used for protein synthesis, while the smooth ER is used more for the processing of toxins and calcium regulation in the cell.
- The Golgi apparatus has two interconnected round Golgi cisternae. Compartments of the apparatus forms multiple tubular-reticular networks responsible for organization, stack connection and cargo transport that display a continuous grape-like stringed vesicles ranging from 50 to 60 nm. The apparatus consists of three main compartments, a flat disc-shaped cisterna with tubular-reticular networks and vesicles.

=== Variations ===
The cell membrane has different lipid and protein compositions in distinct types of cells and may have therefore specific names for certain cell types.

- Sarcolemma in muscle cells: Sarcolemma is the name given to the cell membrane of muscle cells. Although the sarcolemma is similar to other cell membranes, it has other functions that set it apart. For instance, the sarcolemma transmits synaptic signals, helps generate action potentials, and is very involved in muscle contraction. Unlike other cell membranes, the sarcolemma makes up small channels called T-tubules that pass through the entirety of muscle cells. It has also been found that the average sarcolemma is 10 nm thick as opposed to the 4 nm thickness of a general cell membrane.
- Oolemma is the cell membrane of an oocyte: The oolemma of an oocyte, (immature egg cell) is not consistent with a lipid bilayer as the bilayer is not present and does not consist of lipids. Rather, the structure has an inner layer, the fertilization envelope, and the exterior is made up of the zona pellucida (vitelline membrane in non-mammals), which is made up of glycoproteins; however, channels and proteins are still present for their functions in the membrane.
- Axolemma: The specialized plasma membrane on the axons of nerve cells that is responsible for the generation of the action potential. It consists of a granular, densely packed lipid bilayer that works closely with the cytoskeleton components spectrin and actin. These cytoskeleton components are able to bind to and interact with transmembrane proteins in the axolemma.

== Permeability ==
The permeability of a membrane is the rate of passive diffusion of molecules through the membrane. These molecules are known as permeant molecules. Permeability depends mainly on the electric charge and polarity of the molecule and to a lesser extent the molar mass of the molecule. Due to the cell membrane's hydrophobic nature, small electrically neutral molecules pass through the membrane more easily than charged, large ones. The inability of charged molecules to pass through the cell membrane results in pH partition of substances throughout the fluid compartments of the body.

== See also ==
- Annular lipid shell – Lipids or lipidic molecules which preferentially bind to membrane proteins in cells
- Artificial cell – Engineered component of a biological cell
- Bacterial cell structure – Specialized anatomy and physiology of bacteria
- Bangstad syndrome – Inherited congenital disorder associated with abnormalities of the cell membrane
- Cell cortex – Layer on the inner face of a cell membrane
- Cell damage – Damaging changes to a biological cell, including damage to cell membrane
- Cell theory – Theory that living organisms are made up of cells
- Cytoneme – Cellular projections that are specialized for exchange of signaling proteins between cells
- Elasticity of cell membranes – Ability of cell membranes to deform elastically
- Gram-positive bacteria – Bacteria that give a positive result in the Gram stain test
- Membrane models – Models for cell membranes
- Membrane nanotubule – Biological structure
- History of cell membrane theory
- Lipid raft – Combination in the membranes of cells
- Trogocytosis – Cellular process
