= Davson–Danielli model =

Cell anatomy term

The Davson–Danielli model (or paucimolecular model) was a model of the plasma membrane of a cell, proposed in 1935 by Hugh Davson and James Danielli. The model describes a phospholipid bilayer that lies between two layers of globular proteins, which is both trilaminar and lipoprotinious. The phospholipid bilayer had already been proposed by Gorter and Grendel in 1925; however, the flanking proteinaceous layers in the Davson–Danielli model were novel and intended to explain Danielli's observations on the surface tension of lipid bi-layers (It is now known that the phospholipid head groups are sufficient to explain the measured surface tension).

Evidence for the model included electron microscopy, in which high-resolution micrographs showed three distinct layers within a cell membrane, with an inner white core and two flanking dark layers. Since proteins usually appear dark and phospholipids white, the micrographs were interpreted as a phospholipid bilayer sandwiched between two protein layers. The model proposed an explanation for the ability for certain molecules to permeate the cell membrane while other molecules could not, while also accounting for the thinness of cell membranes.

Despite the Davson–Danielli model being scientifically accepted, the model made assumptions, such as assuming that all membranes had the same structure, thickness and lipid-protein ratio, contradicting the observation that membranes could have specialized functions. Furthermore, the Davson–Danielli model could not account for certain observed phenomena, notably the bulk movement of molecules through the plasma membrane through active transport. Another shortcoming of the Davson–Danielli model was that many membrane proteins were known to be amphipathic and mostly hydrophobic, and therefore existing outside of the cell membranes in direct contact remained an unresolved complication.

The Davson–Danielli model was scientifically accepted until Seymour Jonathan Singer and Garth L. Nicolson advanced the fluid mosaic model in 1972. The fluid mosaic model expanded on the Davson–Danielli model by including transmembrane proteins, and eliminated the previously-proposed flanking protein layers that were not well-supported by experimental evidence. The experimental evidence that falsified the Davson–Danielli model included membrane freeze-fracturing, which revealed irregular rough surfaces in the membrane, representing trans-membrane integral proteins and fluorescent antibody tagging of membrane proteins, which demonstrated their fluidity within the membrane.

== See also ==
- Fluid mosaic model
