= Journal of Receptors and Signal Transduction =

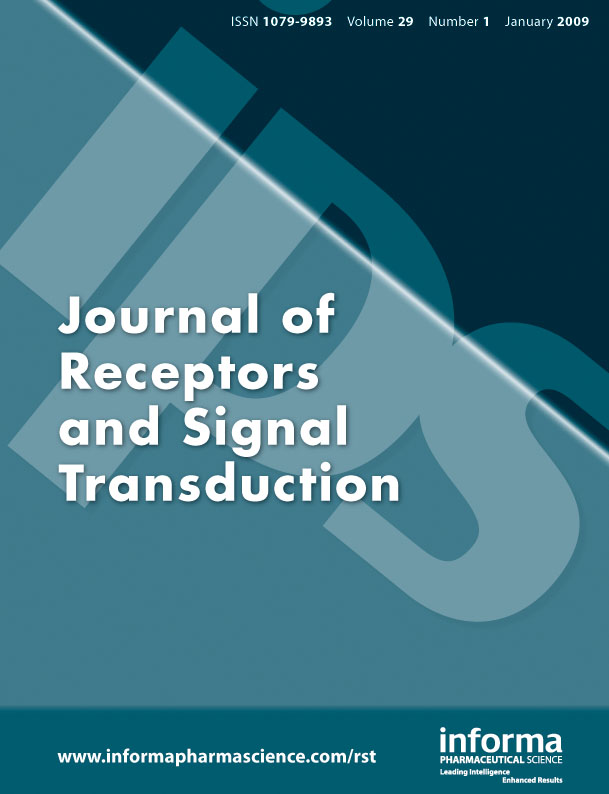
- Discipline: Cell physiology
- Language: English
- Edited by: Alex Eberle, Terrence Kenakin

Publication details
- History: 1980–present
- Publisher: Informa
- Frequency: Bimonthly
- Impact factor: 2.2 (2016)

Standard abbreviations
- ISO 4: J. Recept. Signal Transduct.

Indexing
- CODEN: JRETET
- ISSN: 1079-9893 (print); 1532-4281 (web)
- LCCN: 95660715
- OCLC no.: 31634807

Links
- Journal homepage; Online access; Online archive

The Journal of Receptors and Signal Transduction is a peer-reviewed scientific journal that publishes laboratory and clinical studies, reviews, and brief communications on biological receptors and associated signal transduction pathways for ligands involved in the regulation of central and peripheral tissues and cells. It is published by Informa. The editors in chief are Alex N. Eberle (University of Basel, Switzerland) and Terrence Kenakin (GlaxoSmithKline, Research Triangle Park, NC, United States).

== Abstracting and indexing ==
The Journal of Receptors and Signal Tranduction is abstracted and indexed in BIOBASE, Biological Abstracts, BIOSIS Previews, Current Contents/Life Sciences, EMBASE, PubMed/MedLine, Science Citation Index, and SCOPUS. According to the Journal Citation Reports, its 2009 impact factor is 1.517, ranking it 212th out of 283 journals in the category "Biochemistry and Molecular Biology" and 136th out of 161 in the category "Cell Biology".
