= Two-dimensional gas =

A two-dimensional gas is a collection of objects constrained to move in a planar or other two-dimensional space in a gaseous state. The objects can be: classical ideal gas elements such as rigid disks undergoing elastic collisions; elementary particles; or any ensemble of individual objects in physics which obeys laws of motion without binding interactions. The concept of a two-dimensional gas is used either because:

a. the issue being studied actually takes place in two dimensions (as certain surface molecular phenomena); or,
b. the two-dimensional form of the problem is more tractable than the analogous mathematically more complex three-dimensional problem.

While physicists have studied simple two-body interactions on a plane for centuries, the attention given to the two-dimensional gas (having many bodies in motion) is a 20th-century pursuit. Applications have led to better understanding of superconductivity, gas thermodynamics, certain solid-state problems, and several questions in quantum mechanics.

== Classical mechanics ==
Two-dimensional elastic collision

Research at Princeton University in the early 1960s posed the question of whether the Maxwell–Boltzmann statistics and other thermodynamic laws could be derived from Newtonian laws applied to multi-body systems rather than through the conventional methods of statistical mechanics. While this question appears intractable from a three-dimensional closed-form solution, the problem behaves differently in two-dimensional space. In particular an ideal two-dimensional gas was examined from the standpoint of relaxation time to equilibrium velocity distribution given several arbitrary initial conditions of the ideal gas. Relaxation times were shown to be very fast: on the order of mean free time.

In 1996 a computational approach was taken to the classical mechanics non-equilibrium problem of heat flow within a two-dimensional gas. This simulation work showed that for N>1500, good agreement with continuous systems is obtained.

== Electron gas ==
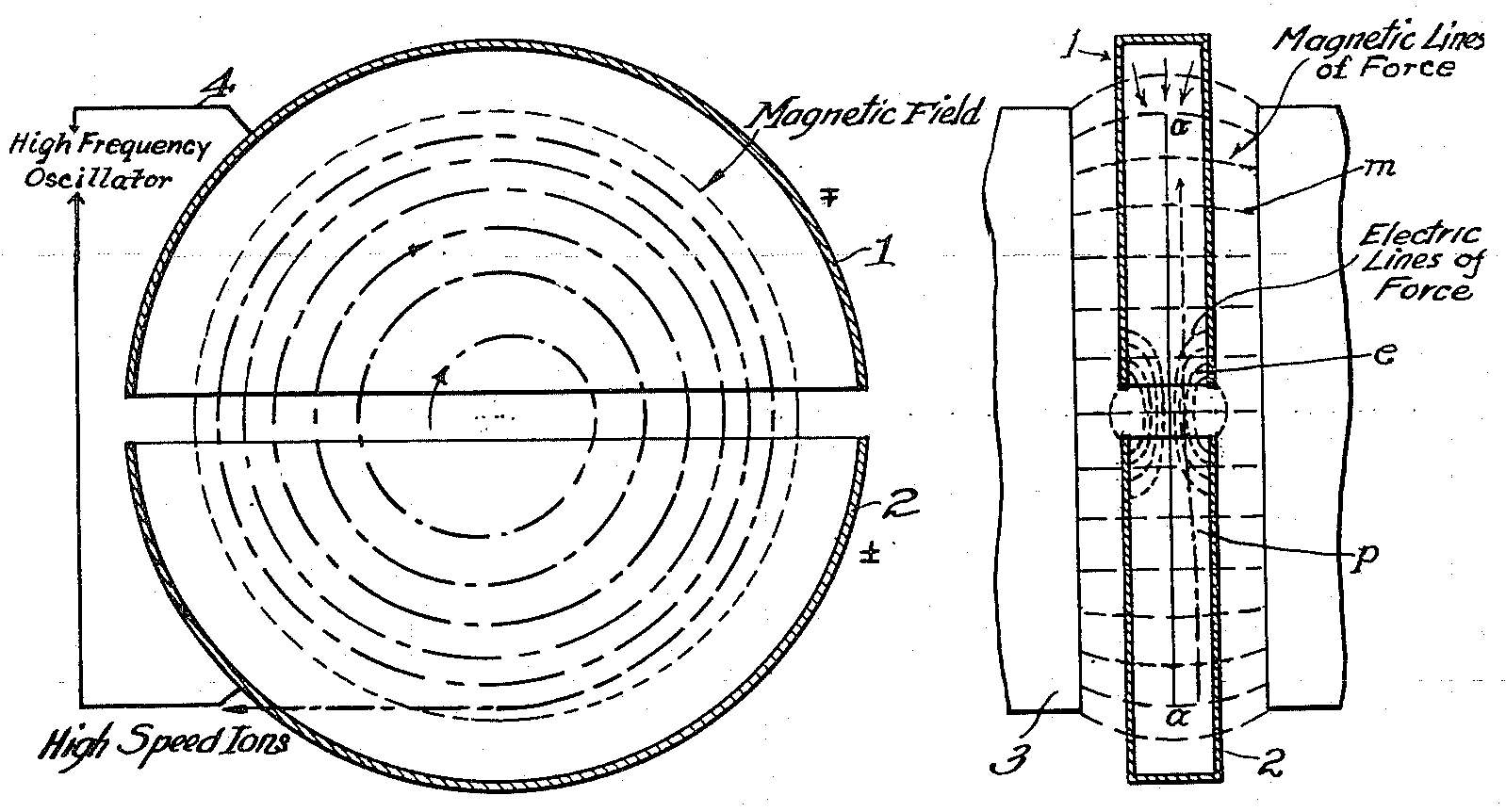
Diagram of cyclotron operation from Lawrence's 1934 patent

While the principle of the cyclotron to create a two-dimensional array of electrons has existed since 1934, the tool was originally not really used to analyze interactions among the electrons (e.g. two-dimensional gas dynamics). An early research investigation explored cyclotron resonance behavior and the de Haas–Van Alphen effect in a two-dimensional electron gas. The investigator demonstrated that for a two-dimensional gas, the de Haas–van Alphen oscillation period is independent of the short-range electron interactions.

== Later applications to Bose gas ==
In 1991 a theoretical proof was made that a Bose gas can exist in two dimensions. In the same work an experimental recommendation was made that could verify the hypothesis.

== Experimental research with a molecular gas ==
In general, 2D molecular gases are experimentally observed on weakly interacting surfaces such as metals, graphene etc. at a non-cryogenic temperature and a low surface coverage. As a direct observation of individual molecules is not possible due to fast diffusion of molecules on a surface, experiments are either indirect (observing an interaction of a 2D gas with surroundings, e.g. condensation of a 2D gas) or integral (measuring integral properties of 2D gases, e.g. by diffraction methods).

An example of the indirect observation of a 2D gas is the study of Stranick et al. who used a scanning tunnelling microscope in ultrahigh vacuum (UHV) to image an interaction of a two-dimensional benzene gas layer in contact with a planar solid interface at 77 kelvins. The experimenters observed mobile benzene molecules on the surface of Cu(111), to which a planar monomolecular film of solid benzene adhered. Thus the scientists could witness the equilibrium of the gas in contact with its solid state.

Integral methods that can characterize a 2D gas usually fall into a category of diffraction. The exception is the work of Matvija et al. who used a scanning tunneling microscope to directly visualize a local time-averaged density of molecules on a surface. This method is of special importance as it provides an opportunity to probe local properties of 2D gases; for instance it enables to directly visualize a pair correlation function of a 2D molecular gas in a real space.

If the surface coverage of adsorbates is increased, a 2D liquid is formed, followed by a 2D solid. It was shown that the transition from a 2D gas to a 2D solid state can be controlled by a scanning tunneling microscope which can affect the local density of molecules via an electric field.

== Implications for future research ==
A multiplicity of theoretical physics research directions exist for study via a two-dimensional gas, such as:

- Complex quantum mechanics phenomena, whose solutions may be more appropriate in a two-dimensional environment;
- Studies of phase transitions (e.g. melting phenomena at a planar surface);
- Thin film phenomena such as chemical vapor deposition;
- Surface excitations of a solid.

== See also ==
- Bose gas
- Fermi gas
- Melting point
- Optical lattice
- Three-body problem
