= Georg Hermann Quincke =

German physicist (1834–1924)

Georg Quincke
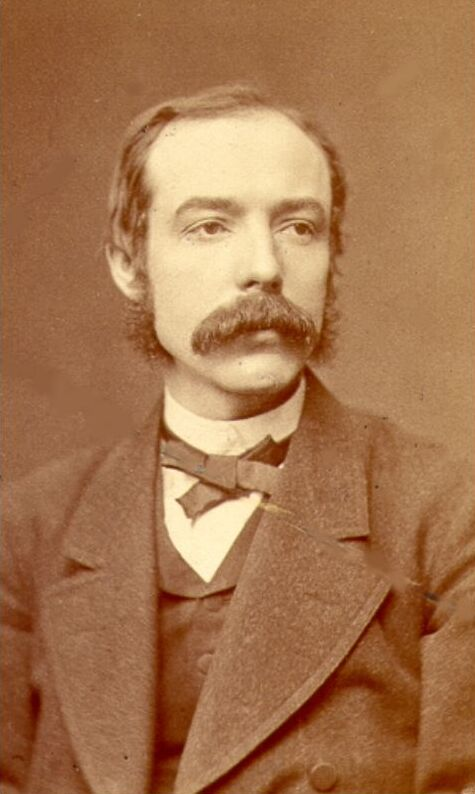
- Quincke, c. 1860
- Born: 19 November 1834; Frankfurt (Oder), Province of Brandenburg, Kingdom of Prussia
- Died: 13 January 1924 (aged 89); Heidelberg, Republic of Baden, Weimar Republic
- Education: University of Berlin (Dr. phil.)
- Awards: ForMemRS (1879)
- Scientific career
- Fields: Physics
- Workplaces: University of Berlin (1865–72); University of Würzburg (1872–75); University of Heidelberg (1875–1907)
- Thesis: De constantibus mercurii capillaribus (1858)
- Doctoral advisor: Heinrich Magnus
- Doctoral students: Ferdinand Braun (1872); Philipp Lenard (1886); James William McBain (1909)

Georg Hermann Quincke (German: [ˈkvɪŋkə]; November 19, 1834 – January 13, 1924) was a German physicist.

== Biography ==
Georg Hermann Quincke was born on 19 November 1834 in Frankfurt an der Oder, Prussia, the son of Hermann Quincke, a physician, and Marie Gabain, who came from a Huguenot family. In 1843, the family moved to Berlin, where he began to study physics at the University of Berlin in 1852. After having studied at the universities of Königsberg and Heidelberg, he returned to Berlin, where he received his Ph.D. in 1858 with a thesis on the capillary constant of mercury.

In 1865, Quincke became an extraordinary professor at the University of Berlin. In 1872, he was appointed a full professor at the University of Würzburg, and in 1875 succeeded Gustav Kirchhoff at the University of Heidelberg, where he remained until his retirement in 1907.

In September 1860, Quincke was one of the participants in the Karlsruhe Congress, the first international conference of chemistry worldwide. He and Adolf von Baeyer represented the University of Berlin in Congress.

Quincke also did important work in the experimental study of the reflection of light, especially from metallic surfaces, and carried on prolonged researches on the subject of the influence of electric forces upon the constants of different forms of matter, modifying the dissociation hypothesis of Clausius.

Quincke's interference tube is an apparatus that Quincke built in 1866, which demonstrates destructive interference of sound waves. It is also known as the Herschel–Quincke tube; John Herschel had proposed a similar apparatus, but did not build it. The principles of the apparatus are now applied in mufflers and other noise management devices.

Quincke received a DCL from the University of Oxford and an LL.D. from the universities of Cambridge and Glasgow. In 1879, he was elected a Foreign Member of the Royal Society. In 1885, he published Geschichte des physikalischen Instituts der Universität Heidelberg. On 26 April 1892, he was elected an Honorary Member of the Manchester Literary and Philosophical Society.

Quincke died on 13 January 1924 in Heidelberg at the age of 89. He is believed to have been the last living participant of the Karlsruhe Congress.

== See also ==
- History of cell membrane theory
