= Journal of Cellular Physiology =

- Discipline: Cellular physiology
- Language: English
- Edited by: Alexander Hutchison

Publication details
- History: 1932–1965: Journal of Cellular and Comparative Physiology; 1966–Present: Journal of Cellular Physiology
- Publisher: Wiley-Liss
- Impact factor: 5.6 (2022)

Standard abbreviations
- ISO 4: J. Cell. Physiol.

Indexing
- CODEN: JCLLAX
- ISSN: 0021-9541 (print); 1097-4652 (web)

Links
- Journal homepage; Online archive

The Journal of Cellular Physiology is a peer-reviewed scientific journal focusing on all aspects of cellular physiology. The journal was originally established as Journal of Cellular and Comparative Physiology in 1932 and was renamed to its current title in 1966. The editor-in-chief is Alexander Hutchison (Wiley & Sons, Inc).

== Indexing ==
- Academic Search
- BIOBASE
- Biochemistry & Biophysics Citation Index
- Biological Abstracts
- BIOSIS Previews
- CAB HEALTH
- CABDirect
- Chemical Abstracts Service/SciFinder
- Current Abstracts
- Current Awareness in Biological Sciences
- Current Contents/Life Sciences
- Current Opinion in Cell Biology
- Current Opinion in Oncology
- Current Opinion in Orthopaedics
- EMBASE/Excerpta Medica
- Embiology
- IBIDS: International Bibliographic Information on Dietary Supplements
- Index Medicus/MEDLINE/PubMed
- Journal Citation Reports/Science Edition
- LEIsure Recreation and Tourism Abstracts
- LEIsure Tourism Database
- MEDLINE/PubMed
- Protozoological Abstracts
- Reference Update
- Science Citation Index
- Science Citation Index Expanded
- SCOPUS
- Soybean Abstracts Online
- VINITI
- Web of Science

According to the Journal Citation Reports, the journal has a 2020 impact factor of 6.384, ranking it 56th out of 195 journals in the category "Cell Biology" and 7th out of 81 journals in the category "Physiology".
