= Bangstad syndrome =

Inherited congenital disorder associated with abnormalities of the cell membrane

- Other names: Ataxia-diabetes-goiter-gonadal insufficiency syndrome
- This condition is inherited in an autosomal recessive manner

Bangstad syndrome is a severe, inherited congenital disorder associated with abnormalities of the cell membrane.

It was characterized in 1989 by H. J. Bangstad.

== Presentation ==
Presenting at birth, features of the disorder include moderately severe IUGR, microcephaly, craniosynostosis, moderately severe post-uterine growth retardation, deafness, deep-set eyes, cryptorchidism, truncal obesity and acanthosis nigricans, small teeth, prognathism, dislocated radial heads without generalized skeletal dysplasia, however, tall vertebrae, moderate intellectual disability, hypothyroidism, insulin resistance, hypoparathyroidism.

== Diagnosis ==
Thyroid-stimulating hormone, parathyroid hormone, luteinizing hormone, follicle-stimulating hormone, adrenocorticotropic hormone, glucagon, and insulin levels in the blood are usually elevated.
