= PH partition theory =

Attempt to explain drug bioavailability in humans

pH partition theory is a theory developed in the early 20th century as an attempt to explain drug bioavailability in humans. It describes the tendency for weak acids to accumulate in basic fluid compartments, and weak bases to accumulate in acidic compartments. The negative charge of deprotonated acids in basic solutions and, conversely, the positive charge state of weak bases in acidic solutions is used to explain this phenomenon as electric charge decreases membrane permeability. pH partition theory is somewhat useful in explaining the accumulation of weak acids and bases; however, many other factors influence molecular transport in living systems, so it is not a general rule.

== See also ==
- Ion trapping
- Acid dissociation constant - pK_{a}
- Henderson–Hasselbalch equation
