= Two-dimensional liquid =

A two-dimensional liquid (2D liquid) is a collection of objects constrained to move in a planar space or other two-dimensional space in a liquid state.

== Relations with 3D liquids ==
The movement of the particles in a 2D liquid is similar to 3D, but with limited degrees of freedom— for example, rotational motion can be limited to rotation about only one axis, in contrast to a 3D liquid, where rotation of molecules about two or three axes would be possible. The same is true for the translational motion. The particles in 2D liquids can move in a 2D plane, whereas the particles is a 3D liquid can move in three directions inside the 3D volume. Vibrational motion is in most cases not constrained in comparison to 3D. The relations with other states of aggregation (see below) are also analogously in 2D and 3D.

== Relation to other states of aggregation ==
2D liquids are related to 2D gases. If the density of a 2D liquid is decreased, a 2D gas is formed. This was observed by scanning tunnelling microscopy under ultra-high vacuum (UHV) conditions for molecular adsorbates. 2D liquids are related to 2D solids. If the density of a 2D liquid is increased, the rotational degree of freedom is frozen and a 2D solid is created.
