= Garth L. Nicolson =

American biochemist (born 1943)

- Born: October 1, 1943 (age 82); Los Angeles, California, U.S.
- Education: University of California, Los Angeles (BS); University of California, San Diego (PhD)
- Known for: Fluid Mosaic Model; Gulf War syndrome
- Spouse: Nancy L. Nicolson
- Scientific career
- Fields: Biochemistry; Cell biology
- Workplaces: Salk Institute for Biological Studies; University of California, Irvine; University of Texas; Texas A&M University; The Institute for Molecular Medicine
- Website: www.immed.org

Garth L. Nicolson (born October 1, 1943) is an American biochemist who made a scientific model for cell membrane, known as the fluid mosaic model. He is the founder of The Institute for Molecular Medicine at California, and he serves as the president, chief scientific officer and emeritus professor of molecular pathology. He is also a conjoint professor in the Faculty of Science and Technology, University of Newcastle, Australia.

During the outbreak of the Gulf War syndrome, he was the leading authority on the study of the cause, treatment and prevention of the disease. He was appointed chairman of the Medical-Scientific Panel for the Persian Gulf War Veterans Conference. On suspicion of the bacterium that caused the disease as a product of biological warfare, he made extensive scientific investigations and served as authority to the United States House of Representatives. For his service he was conferred honorary Colonel of the US Army Special Forces and honorary US Navy SEAL.

With S.J. Singer, Nicolson published a paper titled "The Fluid Mosaic Model of the Structure of Cell Membranes" in 1972, which is now regarded as a classic paper in cell biology.

With over 600 scientific papers, the majority of Nicolson's research is in cancer biology and cellular properties related to aging.

== Biography ==
Nicolson was born in Los Angeles, California. He graduated from the University of California, Los Angeles in 1965 with a major in chemistry. He joined research in biochemistry at the University of California, San Diego, from where he earned his PhD in 1970. He was a USPHS Predoctoral Fellow from 1967 to 1970. During 1970–1971 he worked as senior research associate in the Armand Hammer Cancer Centre of the Cancer Council Laboratory at the Salk Institute for Biological Studies, La Jolla. He became head of the Cancer Council Laboratory, as well as director of Electron Microscopy Laboratory in 1972. In 1974 he took the chair of the department of cancer biology, the post he held till 1976. In 1975 he was appointed professor in the Department of Developmental and Cell Biology at the University of California, Irvine. In 1978 he additionally became professor in the department of physiology and biophysics at the College of Medicine, University of California, Irvine. In 1980 he was conferred the post Florence M. Thomas Professor of Cancer Research at the University of Texas M. D. Anderson Cancer Center, Houston, where he worked for seven years. Between 1980 and 1996 he was also professor at the Graduate School of Biomedical Sciences, the University of Texas Health Science Center; as well as David Bruton Jr. Chair in Cancer Research, professor and chairman of tumor biology at The University of Texas M. D. Anderson Cancer Center. He was also professor in the department of pathology and laboratory medicine at the University of Texas Medical School from 1982 to 1998. During 1981–1998 he was adjunct professor in the department of pathology at the school of veterinary medicine, Texas A & M University. From 1989 to 1999 he was professor in the department of internal medicine at the University of Texas Medical School. In 1996 he founded The Institute for Molecular Medicine at Huntington Beach in 1996. He became its president, chief scientific officer and research professor of molecular pathology. He also serves as professor of integrative medicine at Capitol University of Integrative Medicine. Since 2003 he is also the conjoint professor in the faculty of science and technology at the University of Newcastle, Australia. He is a founding editor of the editorial board of the Cancer and Metastasis Reviews.

== Contributions ==
=== Fluid mosaic model of cell membrane ===
While working as research associate at the Salk Institute for Biological Studies, Nicolson collaborated with S.J. Singer at the University of California, San Diego. They made a seminal model for the structure of cell membranes, which they named the Fluid Mosaic Model, and published in a 12-page paper in the February 18, 1972, issue of Science. It was the first model in cell biology to be based on thermodynamics properties. Earlier descriptions of the cell membrane had serious inconsistencies with observed properties of the lipid bilayer. According to the Fluid Mosaic Model, in contrast to other models, the cell membrane is composed of a single lipid bilayer which is associated with two groups of proteins. Peripheral proteins are located on the surface, while integral proteins are embedded the lipid layer. The proteins are highly varied, thus, creating a mosaic pattern. Majority of the membrane is composed of phospholipids, which exhibit fluidity like oil. The phospholids are not just stationary, but are able to move, and the proteins can move in the fluid lipid layer. These properties give the membrane flexibility. The model turned out to be the foundation of modern understanding of cell membrane structure and functions. Although its basic assumptions are still true, the dynamic nature has been underestimated, and more information have been incorporated with new discoveries.

=== Gulf War syndrome and controversy ===
After the Gulf War of 1990–1991, a number of war veterans suffered from similar illness, popularly dubbed Gulf War syndrome. They indicated symptoms like chronic fatigue, headaches, memory loss, muscle pain, nausea, gastrointestinal problems, joint pain, lymph node pain, increased chemical sensitivities and other signs and symptoms. Nicolson became one of the leading experts in the investigation of the cause and cure of the disease. Initially the US government disregarded the illnesses as the aftermath of the Gulf War, such as exposure to biological or chemical warfare. Nicolson and his wife Nancy became the main voice to raise the problem. They identified the causal pathogen as Mycoplasma fermentans, which was a different strain from the natural pathogen, raising the possibility that it was man-made biological weapon. They successfully treated patients with multiple courses of specific antibiotics, such as doxycycline, ciprofloxacin, azithromycin, clarithromycin or minocycline. Nicolson's "Written Testimony" to the US Senate in 1998 states that: "We consider it quite likely that many of the Desert Storm veterans suffering from the GWI signs and symptoms may have been exposed to chemical/biological toxins (exogenous or endogenous sources of these agents) containing slowly proliferating microorganisms (Mycoplasma, Brucella, Coxiella, etc.), and such infections, although not usually fatal, can produce various chronic signs and symptoms long after exposure." While other researchers found negative results for Mycoplasma infection, Nicolson's team found definite high prevalence of Mycoplasma infections.

== Awards and recognitions ==
- Annual Award of the Common Cause Medical Research Foundation of Canada, in 2006
- Innovative Medicine Award of Canada, in 2002
- Stephen Paget Award from Metastasis Research Society, in 1998
- Albert Schweitzer Award, in 1998
- Indo-American Society for Health & Laboratory Professionals Award, in 1996
- Colonel (Honorary) of the U. S. Army Special Forces, in 1995
- SEAL (Honorary) of the U.S. Navy Special Forces, in 1995
- Burroughs Wellcome Medal from the Royal Society of Medicine Foundation, London, in 1991
- Outstanding Faculty Award from The University of Texas Health Science Center at Houston, in 1991
- U.S. National Cancer Institute U.S.S.R. Scientist Exchange Award for Collaborative Research on Molecular and Genetic Aspects of Tumor Metastasis, in 1991
- NCI/NIH Outstanding Investigator Award, in 1987
- President of the Metastasis Research Society, 1988–1990 (Secretary-Treasurer, 1990–1998, and Vice President, 1986–1988)
- Member, board of directors of the American Association for Cancer Research, 1985–1988
- Annual Award of the Japan Histochemical Society, in 1976
- Upjohn Biology Education Award, in 1976
- Presidential Award of the Electron Microscopy Society of America, in 1971
