= James Danielli =

English biologist (1911–1984)

James Frederic Danielli FRS (1911–1984) was an English biologist.

He was famous for research on the structure and the permeability of cell membranes, developing a physical-chemical model in collaboration with the physiologist Hugh Davson. This became known as the Davson-Danielli or "protein sandwich" model. He also carried out studies on the chemistry of enzymes and proteins and tried to construct an artificial "cell".
