= Hugh Davson =

English physiologist

Hugh Davson (25 November 1909 – 2 July 1996) was an English physiologist who worked on membrane transport and ocular fluids.

Davson was born in Paddington, London, the son of physician Wilfred Maynard Davson and Mary Louisa Scott.

He attended University College School. He later studied at University College London and took a variety of research posts at institutes such as UCL, and Canada's Dalhousie University. With James Danielli he proposed a model for cell membrane structure which became known as the Davson-Danielli or "protein sandwich" model. In 1931 he married the society portrait painter Marjorie Heath with whom he had one daughter. He was a cousin of the renowned journalist and broadcaster, Alistair Cooke.

He had intimate friendships with influential individuals such as Winston Churchill and Clement Attlee.
