= Ernest Overton =

British and Swedish physiologist and biologist

Charles Ernest Overton (1865–1933) was a British and Swedish physiologist and biologist, now regarded as a pioneer of the theory of the cell membrane.

In the last years of the 19th century Overton did experimental work, allowing the distinction to be drawn between the cell wall of plants and their cytoplasmic membrane. He studied the permeability of a range of biological materials to around 500 chemical compounds. In 1900, Overton proposed a biomembrane model "Overton Biomembrane Model" which stated that biomembranes are made up of lipids. He gave this statement on the basis of observation of transport of lipid soluble substances across the biomembranes.

He came to Lund University in Sweden as a professor, and married Louise Petrén-Overton, the first woman in Sweden with a doctorate in mathematics; they had four children.

== See also ==
- Meyer-Overton hypothesis
