= Seymour Jonathan Singer =

American cell and molecular biologist

- Born: May 23, 1924; New York City, U.S.
- Died: February 2, 2017 (aged 92); La Jolla, San Diego, California, U.S.
- Education: Columbia University (BA); Polytechnic Institute of Brooklyn (PhD)
- Known for: Fluid Mosaic Model of the cell membrane Ferritin-labeled antibodies Work on sickle-cell anemia
- Awards: National Academy of Sciences (1969); American Academy of Arts and Sciences (1971); Guggenheim Fellowship (1959); E.B. Wilson Medal (1991)
- Scientific career
- Fields: Cell biology Biochemistry
- Workplaces: Yale University; University of California, San Diego

Seymour Jonathan Singer (May 23, 1924 – February 2, 2017), more commonly known as Jonathan or “Jon” Singer, was an American cell biologist and professor of biology at the University of California, San Diego. He is best known for co-developing the Fluid Mosaic Model of the cell membrane, a central concept in modern cell biology.

== Early life and career ==
Singer was born in New York City and attended Columbia University, where he earned his B.A. in 1943. He received his doctorate from the Polytechnic Institute of Brooklyn in 1947. He worked as a postdoctoral fellow with Linus Pauling at Caltech during 1947–1948, where he participated in studies demonstrating that hemoglobin in sickle-cell anemia differs from normal hemoglobin, reported in the paper "Sickle Cell Anemia, a Molecular Disease". He worked for the U.S. Public Health Service between 1948 and 1950. He joined the Chemistry Department at Yale University as an assistant professor in 1951 and was promoted to associate professor in 1957 and to professor in 1960. There he developed the ferritin-antibody, which was the first electron-dense reagent used for cell staining in electron microscopy imaging. He was awarded a Guggenheim Fellowship for Molecular & Cellular Biology in 1959.

In 1961 he joined the faculty at University of California, San Diego as a professor in the Department of Biology (now the Division of Biological Sciences).

== Research ==
At UCSD, Singer's lab conducted studies on the conformation and organization of membrane proteins in the mid-1960s, using techniques such as optical rotatory dispersion and circular dichroism. These studies contributed to the development of the Fluid Mosaic Model of the cell membrane. He later studied interactions between the cytoskeleton and the cell membrane, including work on proteins such as vinculin and talin that are involved in linking the cytoskeleton to membranes.

In 2003, he published the book The Splendid Feast of Reason, which discusses rationalism and the philosophy of science.

== Honors and awards ==
Singer was elected to the National Academy of Sciences in 1969 and to the American Academy of Arts and Sciences in 1971. He held an American Cancer Society Research Professorship from 1976 to 1991. He received the E.B. Wilson Medal from the American Society for Cell Biology and was appointed a University Professor of the University of California, a systemwide distinction, from 1988 until his retirement in 1995.

== Later life and death ==
Singer died in La Jolla on February 2, 2017.
