= Cell physiology =

Study of cell activity

Cell physiology is the biological study of the activities that take place in a cell to keep it alive. The term physiology refers to normal functions in a living organism. Animal cells, plant cells and microorganism cells show similarities in their functions even though they vary in structure.

== General characteristics ==
There are two types of cells: prokaryotes and eukaryotes. Prokaryotes were the first of the two to develop and do not have a self-contained nucleus. Their mechanisms are simpler than later-evolved eukaryotes, which contain a nucleus that envelops the cell's DNA and some organelles.

=== Prokaryotes ===
Typical prokaryotic cell structure

Prokaryotes have DNA located in an area called the nucleoid, which is not separated from other parts of the cell by a membrane. There are two domains of prokaryotes: bacteria and archaea. Prokaryotes have fewer organelles than eukaryotes. Both have plasma membranes and ribosomes (structures that synthesize proteins and float free in cytoplasm). Two unique characteristics of prokaryotes are fimbriae (finger-like projections on the surface of a cell) and flagella (threadlike structures that aid movement).

=== Eukaryotes ===
Typical eukaryotic animal cell structure

Eukaryotes have a nucleus where DNA is contained. They are usually larger than prokaryotes and contain many more organelles. The nucleus, the feature of a eukaryote that distinguishes it from a prokaryote, contains a nuclear envelope, nucleolus and chromatin. In cytoplasm, endoplasmic reticulum (ER) synthesizes membranes and performs other metabolic activities. There are two types, rough ER (containing ribosomes) and smooth ER (lacking ribosomes). The Golgi apparatus consists of multiple membranous sacs, responsible for manufacturing and shipping out materials such as proteins. Lysosomes are structures that use enzymes to break down substances through phagocytosis, a process that comprises endocytosis and exocytosis. In the mitochondria, metabolic processes such as cellular respiration occur. The cytoskeleton is made of fibers that support the structure of the cell and help the cell move.

== Physiological processes ==
There are different ways through which cells can transport substances across the cell membrane. The two main pathways are passive transport and active transport. Passive transport is more direct and does not require the use of the cell's energy. It relies on an area that maintains a high-to-low concentration gradient. Active transport uses adenosine triphosphate (ATP) to transport a substance that moves against its concentration gradient.

=== Movement of proteins ===
The pathway for proteins to move in cells starts at the ER. Lipids and proteins are synthesized in the ER, and carbohydrates are added to make glycoproteins. Glycoproteins undergo further synthesis in the Golgi apparatus, becoming glycolipids. Both glycoproteins and glycolipids are transported into vesicles to the plasma membrane. The cell releases secretory proteins known as exocytosis.

=== Transport of ions ===
Ion Transport: Direction of Na/K flow

Ions travel across cell membranes through channels, pumps or transporters. In channels, they move down an electrochemical gradient to produce electrical signals. Pumps maintain electrochemical gradients. The main type of pump is the Na/K pump. It moves 3 sodium ions out of a cell and 2 potassium ions into a cell. The process converts one ATP molecule to adenosine diphosphate (ADP) and Phosphate. In a transporter, ions use more than one gradient to produce electrical signals.

Endocytosis in Animal Cells

=== Endocytosis in animal cells ===
Endocytosis is a form of active transport where a cell takes in molecules, using the plasma membrane, and packages them into vesicles.

=== Phagocytosis ===
In phagocytosis, a cell surrounds particles including food particles through an extension of the pseudopods, which are located on the plasma membrane. The pseudopods then package the particles in a food vacuole. The lysosome, which contains hydrolytic enzymes, then fuses with the food vacuole. Hydrolytic enzymes, also known as digestive enzymes, then digest the particles within the food vacuole.

=== Pinocytosis ===
In pinocytosis, a cell takes in ("gulps") extracellular fluid into vesicles, which are formed when plasma membrane surrounds the fluid. The cell can take in any molecule or solute through this process.

=== Receptor-mediated endocytosis ===
Receptor-mediated endocytosis is a form of pinocytosis where a cell takes in specific molecules or solutes. Proteins with receptor sites are located on the plasma membrane, binding to specific solutes. The receptor proteins that are attached to the specific solutes go inside coated pits, forming a vesicle. The vesicles then surround the receptors that are attached to the specific solutes, releasing their molecules. Receptor proteins are recycled back to the plasma membrane by the same vesicle.
