= Biological membrane =

Enclosing or separating membrane in organisms acting as selective semi-permeable barrier

Cross-sectional view of the structures that can be formed by phospholipids in an aqueous solution

A biological membrane or biomembrane is a selectively permeable membrane that separates the interior of a cell from the external environment or creates intracellular compartments by serving as a boundary between one part of the cell and another. Biological membranes, in the form of eukaryotic cell membranes, consist of a phospholipid bilayer with embedded, integral and peripheral proteins used in communication and transportation of chemicals and ions. The bulk of lipids in a cell membrane provides a fluid matrix for proteins to rotate and laterally diffuse for physiological functioning. Proteins are adapted to high membrane fluidity environment of the lipid bilayer with the presence of an annular lipid shell, consisting of lipid molecules bound tightly to the surface of integral membrane proteins. The cell membranes are different from the isolating tissues formed by layers of cells, such as mucous membranes, basement membranes, and serous membranes.

== Composition ==
=== Asymmetry ===
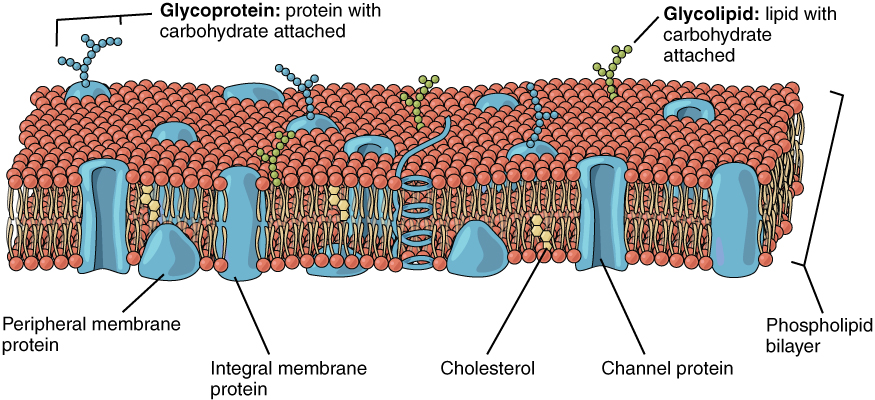
A fluid membrane model of the lipid bilayer.

The lipid bilayer consists of two layers- an outer leaflet and an inner leaflet. The components of bilayers are distributed unequally between the two surfaces to create asymmetry between the outer and inner surfaces. This asymmetric organization is important for cell functions such as cell signaling. The asymmetry of the biological membrane reflects the different functions of the two leaflets of the membrane. As seen in the fluid membrane model of the phospholipid bilayer, the outer leaflet and inner leaflet of the membrane are asymmetrical in their composition. Certain proteins and lipids rest only on one surface of the membrane and not the other.

- Both the plasma membrane and internal membranes have cytosolic and exoplasmic faces.
- This orientation is maintained during membrane trafficking – proteins, lipids, glycoconjugates facing the lumen of the ER and Golgi get expressed on the extracellular side of the plasma membrane. In eukaryotic cells, new phospholipids are manufactured by enzymes bound to the part of the endoplasmic reticulum membrane that faces the cytosol. These enzymes, which use free fatty acids as substrates, deposit all newly made phospholipids into the cytosolic half of the bilayer. To enable the membrane as a whole to grow evenly, half of the new phospholipid molecules then have to be transferred to the opposite monolayer. This transfer is catalyzed by enzymes called flippases. In the plasma membrane, flippases transfer specific phospholipids selectively, so that different types become concentrated in each monolayer.

Using selective flippases is not the only way to produce asymmetry in lipid bilayers, however. In particular, a different mechanism operates for glycolipids—the lipids that show the most striking and consistent asymmetric distribution in animal cells.

=== Lipids ===
The biological membrane is made up of lipids with hydrophobic tails and hydrophilic heads. The hydrophobic tails are hydrocarbon tails whose length and saturation is important in characterizing the cell. Lipid rafts occur when lipid species and proteins aggregate in domains in the membrane. These help organize membrane components into localized areas that are involved in specific processes, such as signal transduction.

Red blood cells, or erythrocytes, have a unique lipid composition. The bilayer of red blood cells is composed of cholesterol and phospholipids in equal proportions by weight. Erythrocyte membrane plays a crucial role in blood clotting. In the bilayer of red blood cells is phosphatidylserine. This is usually in the cytoplasmic side of the membrane. However, it is flipped to the outer membrane to be used during blood clotting.

=== Proteins ===
Phospholipid bilayers contain different proteins. These membrane proteins have various functions and characteristics and catalyze different chemical reactions. Integral proteins span the membranes with different domains on either side. Integral proteins hold strong association with the lipid bilayer and cannot easily become detached. They will dissociate only with chemical treatment that breaks the membrane. Peripheral proteins are unlike integral proteins in that they hold weak interactions with the surface of the bilayer and can easily become dissociated from the membrane. Peripheral proteins are located on only one face of a membrane and create membrane asymmetry.

SOME EXAMPLES OF PLASMA MEMBRANE PROTEINS AND THEIR FUNCTIONS
FUNCTIONAL CLASS	PROTEIN EXAMPLE	SPECIFIC FUNCTION
Transporters	Na^{+} pump	actively pumps Na^{+} out of cells and K^{+} in
Anchors	integrins	link intracellular actin filaments to extracellular matrix proteins
Receptors	platelet-derived growth factor receptor	binds extracellular PDGF and, as a consequence, generates intracellular signals that cause the cell to grow and divide
Enzymes	adenylyl cyclase	catalyzes the production of intracellular signaling molecule cyclic AMP in response to extracellular signals

=== Oligosaccharides ===
Oligosaccharides are sugar containing polymers. In the membrane, they can be covalently bound to lipids to form glycolipids or covalently bound to proteins to form glycoproteins. Membranes contain sugar-containing lipid molecules known as glycolipids. In the bilayer, the sugar groups of glycolipids are exposed at the cell surface, where they can form hydrogen bonds. Glycolipids provide the most extreme example of asymmetry in the lipid bilayer. Glycolipids perform a vast number of functions in the biological membrane that are mainly communicative, including cell recognition and cell-cell adhesion. Glycoproteins are integral proteins. They play an important role in the immune response and protection.

== Formation ==
The phospholipid bilayer is formed due to the aggregation of membrane lipids in aqueous solutions. Aggregation is caused by the hydrophobic effect, where hydrophobic ends come into contact with each other and are sequestered away from water. This arrangement maximises hydrogen bonding between hydrophilic heads and water while minimising unfavorable contact between hydrophobic tails and water. The increase in available hydrogen bonding increases the entropy of the system, creating a spontaneous process.

== Function ==
Biological molecules are amphiphilic or amphipathic, i.e. are simultaneously hydrophobic and hydrophilic. The phospholipid bilayer contains charged hydrophilic headgroups, which interact with polar water. The layers also contain hydrophobic tails, which meet with the hydrophobic tails of the complementary layer. The hydrophobic tails are usually fatty acids that differ in lengths. The interactions of lipids, especially the hydrophobic tails, determine the lipid bilayer physical properties such as fluidity.

Membranes in cells typically define enclosed spaces or compartments in which cells may maintain a chemical or biochemical environment that differs from the outside. For example, the membrane around peroxisomes shields the rest of the cell from peroxides, chemicals that can be toxic to the cell, and the cell membrane separates a cell from its surrounding medium. Peroxisomes are one form of vacuole found in the cell that contain by-products of chemical reactions within the cell. Most organelles are defined by such membranes, and are called membrane-bound organelles.

=== Selective permeability ===
Probably the most important feature of a biomembrane is that it is a selectively permeable structure. This means that the size, charge, and other chemical properties of the atoms and molecules attempting to cross it will determine whether they succeed in doing so. Selective permeability is essential for effective separation of a cell or organelle from its surroundings. Biological membranes also have certain mechanical or elastic properties that allow them to change shape and move as required.

Generally, small hydrophobic molecules can readily cross phospholipid bilayers by simple diffusion.

Particles that are required for cellular function but are unable to diffuse freely across a membrane enter through a membrane transport protein or are taken in by means of endocytosis, where the membrane allows for a vacuole to join onto it and push its contents into the cell. Many types of specialized plasma membranes can separate cell from external environment: apical, basolateral, presynaptic and postsynaptic ones, membranes of flagella, cilia, microvillus, filopodia and lamellipodia, the sarcolemma of muscle cells, as well as specialized myelin and dendritic spine membranes of neurons. Plasma membranes can also form different types of "supramembrane" structures such as caveolae, postsynaptic density, podosome, invadopodium, desmosome, hemidesmosome, focal adhesion, and cell junctions. These types of membranes differ in lipid and protein composition.

Distinct types of membranes also create intracellular organelles: endosome; smooth and rough endoplasmic reticulum; sarcoplasmic reticulum; Golgi apparatus; lysosome; mitochondrion (inner and outer membranes); nucleus (inner and outer membranes); peroxisome; vacuole; cytoplasmic granules; cell vesicles (phagosome, autophagosome, clathrin-coated vesicles, COPI-coated and COPII-coated vesicles) and secretory vesicles (including synaptosome, acrosomes, melanosomes, and chromaffin granules). Different types of biological membranes have diverse lipid and protein compositions. The content of membranes defines their physical and biological properties. Some components of membranes play a key role in medicine, such as the efflux pumps that pump drugs out of a cell.

=== Fluidity ===
The hydrophobic core of the phospholipid bilayer is constantly in motion because of rotations around the bonds of lipid tails. Hydrophobic tails of a bilayer bend and lock together. However, because of hydrogen bonding with water, the hydrophilic head groups exhibit less movement as their rotation and mobility are constrained. This results in increasing viscosity of the lipid bilayer closer to the hydrophilic heads.

Below a transition temperature, a lipid bilayer loses fluidity when the highly mobile lipids exhibits less movement becoming a gel-like solid. The transition temperature depends on such components of the lipid bilayer as the hydrocarbon chain length and the saturation of its fatty acids. Temperature-dependence fluidity constitutes an important physiological attribute for bacteria and cold-blooded organisms. These organisms maintain a constant fluidity by modifying membrane lipid fatty acid composition in accordance with differing temperatures.

In animal cells, membrane fluidity is modulated by the inclusion of the sterol cholesterol. This molecule is present in especially large amounts in the plasma membrane, where it constitutes approximately 20% of the lipids in the membrane by weight. Because cholesterol molecules are short and rigid, they fill the spaces between neighboring phospholipid molecules left by the kinks in their unsaturated hydrocarbon tails. In this way, cholesterol tends to stiffen the bilayer, making it more rigid and less permeable.

For all cells, membrane fluidity is important for many reasons. It enables membrane proteins to diffuse rapidly in the plane of the bilayer and to interact with one another, as is crucial, for example, in cell signaling. It permits membrane lipids and proteins to diffuse from sites where they are inserted into the bilayer after their synthesis to other regions of the cell. It allows membranes to fuse with one another and mix their molecules, and it ensures that membrane molecules are distributed evenly between daughter cells when a cell divides. If biological membranes were not fluid, it is hard to imagine how cells could live, grow, and reproduce.

The fluidity property is at the center of the Helfrich model which allows for calculating the energy cost of an elastic deformation to the membrane.

== See also ==
- Collodion bag
- Fluid mosaic model
- Membrane biology
- Osmosis
- Phospholipid scramblase
- Soft matter
