= Gelatin =

Mixture of peptides and proteins derived from animals

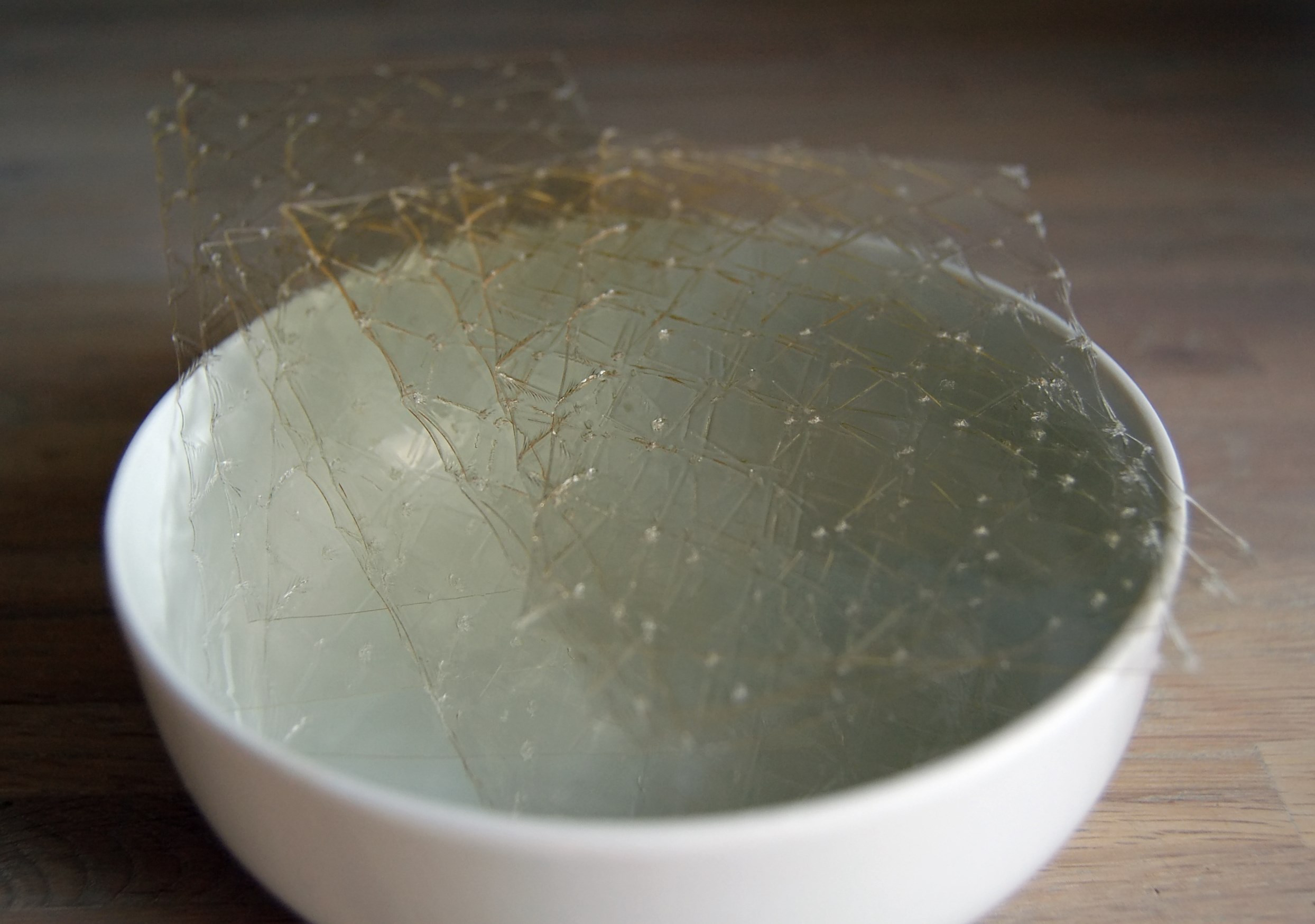
Sheet (or leaf) gelatin for cooking

Gelatin in American English or gelatine in British English (from the Latin gelatus, 'stiff, frozen') is a translucent, colorless, flavorless food ingredient, commonly derived from partial hydrolysis of collagen taken from animal body parts. It is brittle when dry, and rubbery when moist. It is commonly used as a gelling agent in food, beverages, medications, drug or vitamin capsules, photographic films, papers, and cosmetics. It may also be referred to as hydrolyzed collagen, collagen hydrolysate, gelatine hydrolysate, hydrolyzed gelatine, and collagen peptides after it has undergone further hydrolysis.

Substances containing gelatin or functioning in a similar way are called gelatinous substances. Gelatin is an irreversibly hydrolyzed form of collagen, wherein the hydrolysis reduces protein fibrils into smaller peptides; depending on the physical and chemical methods of denaturation, the molecular weight of the peptides falls within a broad range. Gelatin is used in jelly, most gummy candy and marshmallows, ice creams, dips, and yogurts. Gelatin for cooking comes as powder, granules, and sheets. Instant types can be added to the food as they are; others must soak in water beforehand.

Gelatin is a natural polymer derived from collagen through hydrolysis. Its chemical structure is primarily composed of amino acids, including glycine, proline, and hydroxyproline. These amino acid chains form a three-dimensional network through hydrogen bonding and hydrophobic interactions giving gelatin its gelling properties. Gelatin dissolves well in water and can form reversible gel-like substances. When cooled, water is trapped within its network structure, resulting in what is known as a hydrogel.

As a hydrogel, gelatin's uniqueness lies in its ability to maintain a stable structure and function even when it contains up to 90% water. This makes gelatin widely used in medical, food and cosmetic industries, especially in drug delivery systems and wound dressings, as it provides stable hydration and promotes the healing process. Moreover, its biodegradability and biocompatibility make it an ideal hydrogel material. Research on hydrolyzed collagen shows no established benefit for joint health, though it is being explored for wound care. While safety concerns exist due to its animal origins, regulatory bodies have determined the risk of disease transmission to be very low when standard processing methods are followed.

== Characteristics ==
=== Properties ===
Gelatin is a collection of peptides and proteins produced by partial hydrolysis of collagen extracted from the skin, bones, and connective tissues of animals such as domesticated cattle, chickens, pigs, and fish. During hydrolysis, some of the bonds between and within component proteins are broken. Its chemical composition is, in many aspects, closely similar to that of its parent collagen. Photographic and pharmaceutical grades of gelatin generally are sourced from cattle bones and pig skin. Gelatin is classified as a hydrogel.

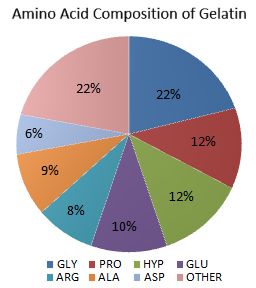
Amino acid composition.

Gelatin is nearly tasteless and odorless with a colorless or slightly yellow appearance. It is transparent and brittle, and it can come as sheets, flakes, or as a powder. Polar solvents like hot water, glycerol, and acetic acid can dissolve gelatin, but it is insoluble in organic solvents like alcohol. Gelatin absorbs 5–10 times its weight in water to form a gel. The gel formed by gelatin can be melted by reheating, and it has an increasing viscosity under stress (thixotropic). The upper melting point of gelatin is below human body temperature, a factor that is important for mouthfeel of foods produced with gelatin. The viscosity of the gelatin-water mixture is greatest when the gelatin concentration is high and the mixture is kept cool at about 4 °C (39 °F). Commercial gelatin will have a gel strength of around 90 to 300 grams Bloom using the Bloom test of gel strength. Gelatin's strength (but not viscosity) declines if it is subjected to temperatures above 100 °C (212 °F), or if it is held at temperatures near 100 °C for an extended period of time.

Gelatins have diverse melting points and gelation temperatures, depending on the source. For example, gelatin derived from fish has a lower melting and gelation point than gelatin derived from beef or pork.

=== Composition ===
When dry, gelatin consists of 98–99% protein, but it is not a nutritionally complete protein since it is missing tryptophan and is deficient in isoleucine, threonine, and methionine. The amino acid content of hydrolyzed collagen is the same as collagen. Hydrolyzed collagen contains 19 amino acids, predominantly glycine (Gly) 26–34%, proline (Pro) 10–18%, and hydroxyproline (Hyp) 7–15%, which together represent around 50% of the total amino acid content. Glycine is responsible for close packing of the chains. Presence of proline restricts the conformation. This is important for gelation properties of gelatin. Other amino acids that contribute highly include: alanine (Ala) 8–11%; arginine (Arg) 8–9%; aspartic acid (Asp) 6–7%; and glutamic acid (Glu) 10–12%.

== Research ==
In 2011, the European Food Safety Authority Panel on Dietetic Products, Nutrition and Allergies concluded that "a cause and effect relationship has not been established between the consumption of collagen hydrolysate and maintenance of joints".

Hydrolyzed collagen has been investigated as a type of wound dressing aimed at correcting imbalances in the wound microenvironment and the treatment of refractory wounds (chronic wounds that do not respond to normal treatment), as well as deep second-degree burn wounds.

=== Safety concerns ===
Hydrolyzed collagen, like gelatin, is made from animal by-products from the meat industry or sometimes animal carcasses removed and cleared by knackers, including skin, bones, and connective tissue.

In 1997, the U.S. Food and Drug Administration (FDA), with support from the TSE (transmissible spongiform encephalopathy) Advisory Committee, began monitoring the potential risk of transmitting animal diseases, especially bovine spongiform encephalopathy (BSE), commonly known as mad cow disease. An FDA study from that year stated: "... steps such as heat, alkaline treatment, and filtration could be effective in reducing the level of contaminating TSE agents; however, scientific evidence is insufficient at this time to demonstrate that these treatments would effectively remove the BSE infectious agent if present in the source material." On 18 March 2016, the FDA finalized three previously issued interim final rules designed to further reduce the potential risk of BSE in human food. The final rule clarified that "gelatin is not considered a prohibited cattle material if it is manufactured using the customary industry processes specified."

The Scientific Steering Committee (SSC) of the European Union in 2003 stated that the risk associated with bovine bone gelatin is very low or zero.

In 2006, the European Food Safety Authority stated that the SSC opinion was confirmed, that the BSE risk of bone-derived gelatin was small, and that it recommended removal of the 2003 request to exclude the skull, brain, and vertebrae of bovine origin older than 12 months from the material used in gelatin manufacturing.

== Production ==
Materials used in gelatin production.

In 2019, the worldwide demand of gelatin was about 620,000 tonnes (1.4×10^{9} lb). On a commercial scale, gelatin is made from by-products of the meat and leather industries. Most gelatin is derived from pork skins, pork and cattle bones, or split cattle hides. Gelatin made from fish by-products avoids some of the religious objections to gelatin consumption. The raw materials are prepared by different curing, acid, and alkali processes that are employed to extract the dried collagen hydrolysate. These processes may take several weeks, and differences in such processes have great effects on the properties of the final gelatin products.

Gelatin also can be prepared at home. Boiling certain cartilaginous cuts of meat or bones results in gelatin being dissolved into the water. Depending on the concentration, the resulting stock (when cooled) will form a jelly or gel naturally. This process is used for aspic.

While many processes exist whereby collagen may be converted to gelatin, they all have several factors in common. The intermolecular and intramolecular bonds that stabilize insoluble collagen must be broken, and also, the hydrogen bonds that stabilize the collagen helix must be broken. The manufacturing processes of gelatin consists of several main stages:

1. Pretreatments to make the raw materials ready for the main extraction step and to remove impurities that may have negative effects on physicochemical properties of the final gelatin product.
2. Hydrolysis of collagen into gelatin.
3. Extraction of gelatin from the hydrolysis mixture, which usually is done with hot water or dilute acid solutions as a multistage process.
4. The refining and recovering treatments including filtration, clarification, evaporation, sterilization, drying, rutting, grinding, and sifting to remove the water from the gelatin solution, to blend the gelatin extracted, and to obtain dried, blended, ground final product.

=== Pretreatments ===
If the raw material used in the production of the gelatin is derived from bones, dilute acid solutions are used to remove calcium and other salts. Hot water or several solvents may be used to reduce the fat content, which should not exceed 1% before the main extraction step. If the raw material consists of hides and skin, then size reduction, washing, hair removal, and degreasing are necessary to prepare the materials for the hydrolysis step.

=== Hydrolysis ===
After preparation of the raw material, i.e., removing some of the impurities such as fat and salts, partially purified collagen is converted into gelatin through hydrolysis. Collagen hydrolysis is performed by one of three different methods: acid-, alkali-, and enzymatic hydrolysis. Acid treatment is especially suitable for less fully cross-linked materials such as pig skin collagen and normally requires 10 to 48 hours. Alkali treatment is suitable for more complex collagen such as that found in bovine hides and requires more time, normally several weeks. The purpose of the alkali treatment is to destroy certain chemical crosslinks still present in collagen. Within the gelatin industry, the gelatin obtained from acid-treated raw material has been called type-A gelatin and the gelatin obtained from alkali-treated raw material is referred to as type-B gelatin.

Advances are occurring to optimize the yield of gelatin using enzymatic hydrolysis of collagen. The treatment time is shorter than that required for alkali treatment, and results in almost complete conversion to the pure product. The physical properties of the final gelatin product are considered better.

=== Extraction ===
Extraction is performed with either water or acid solutions at appropriate temperatures. All industrial processes are based on neutral or acid pH values because although alkali treatments speed up conversion, they also promote degradation processes. Acidic extraction conditions are extensively used in the industry, but the degree of acid varies with different processes. This extraction step is a multistage process, and the extraction temperature usually is increased in later extraction steps, which ensures minimum thermal degradation of the extracted gelatin.

=== Recovery ===
This process includes several steps such as filtration, evaporation, drying, grinding, and sifting. These operations are concentration-dependent and also dependent on the particular gelatin used. Gelatin degradation should be avoided and minimized, so the lowest temperature possible is used for the recovery process. Most recoveries are rapid, with all of the processes being done in several stages to avoid extensive deterioration of the peptide structure. A deteriorated peptide structure would result in a low gel strength, which is not generally desired.

== Uses ==
=== Early history of food applications ===
The 10th-century Kitab al-Tabikh includes a recipe for a fish aspic, made by boiling fish heads.

A recipe for jelled meat broth is found in Le Viandier, written in or around 1375.

In 15th century Britain, cattle hooves were boiled to produce a gel. By the late 17th century, the French inventor Denis Papin had discovered another method of gelatin extraction via boiling of bones. An English patent for gelatin production was granted in 1754. In 1812, the chemist Jean-Pierre-Joseph d'Arcet further experimented with the use of hydrochloric acid to extract gelatin from bones, and later with steam extraction, which was much more efficient. The French government viewed gelatin as a potential source of cheap, accessible protein for the poor, particularly in Paris.

Food applications in France and the United States during the 19th century appear to have established the versatility of gelatin, including the origin of its popularity in the US as Jell-O. In the mid-19th century, the American industrialist and inventor, Peter Cooper, registered a patent for a gelatin dessert powder he called "Portable Gelatin", which only needed the addition of water. In the late 19th century, Charles and Rose Knox set up the Charles B. Knox Gelatin Company in New York, which promoted and popularized the use of gelatin.

=== Culinary uses ===
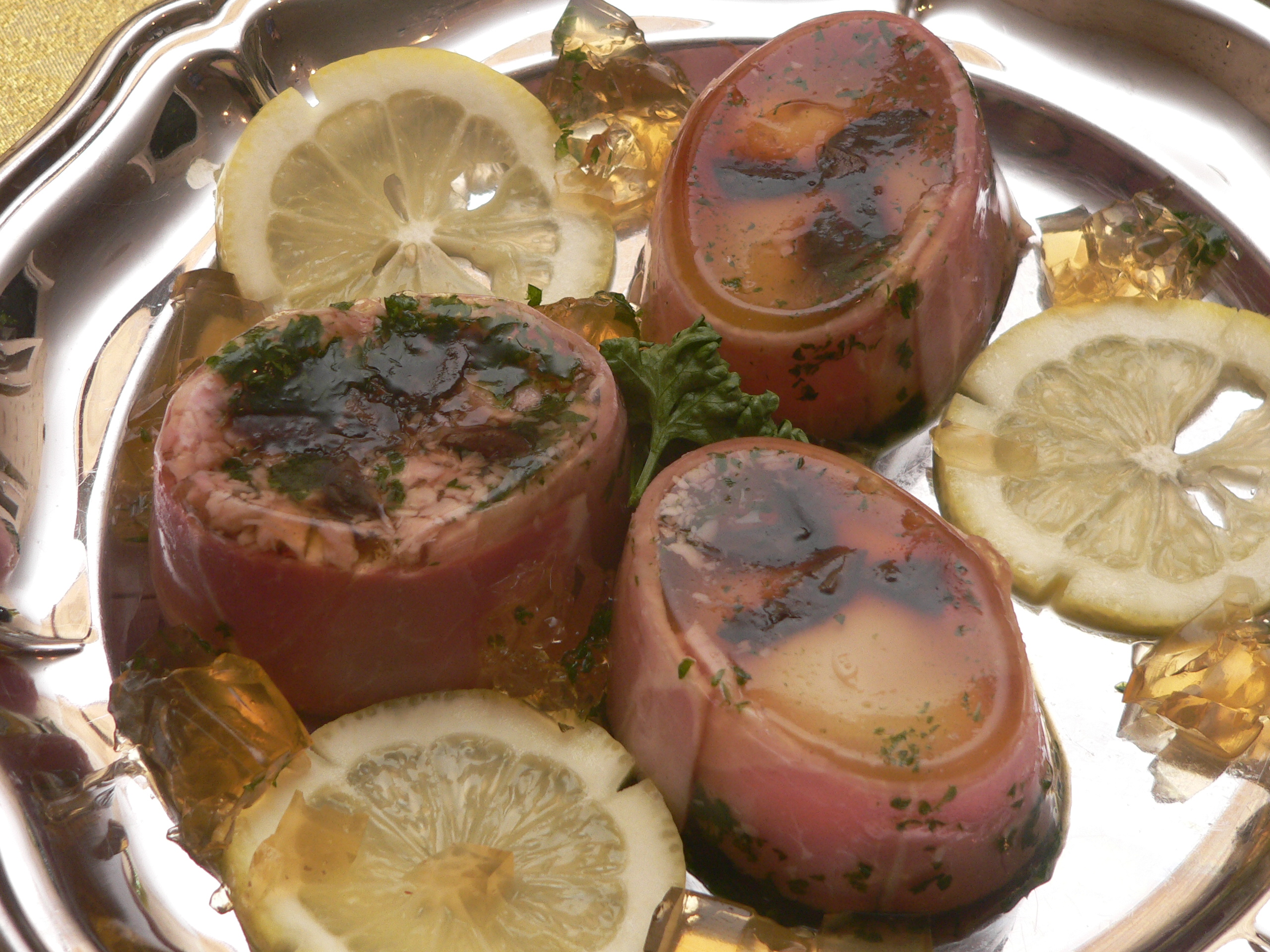
Eggs in aspic.

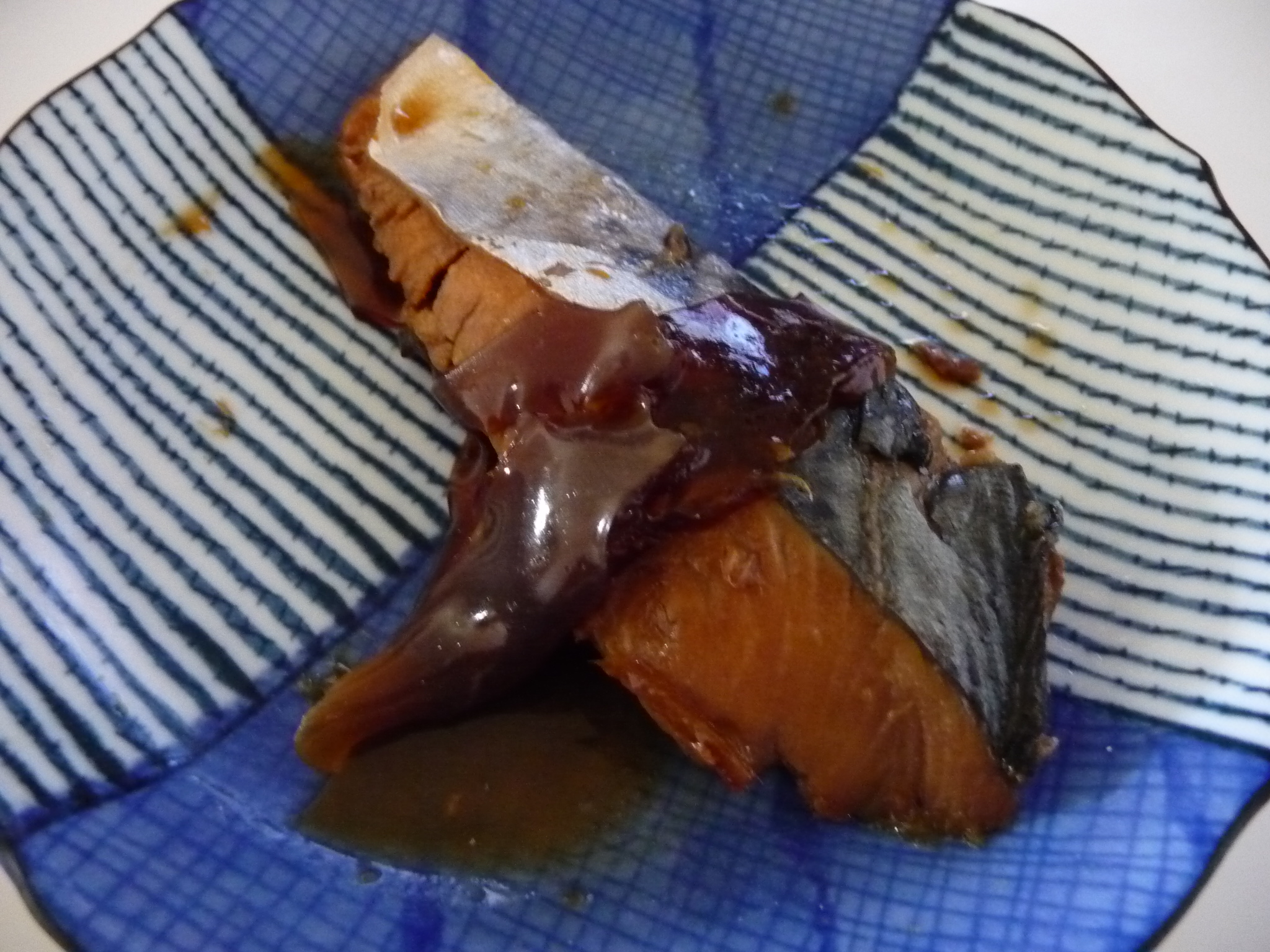
Congealed into jelly gelatin of boiled fish with soy sauce and kept around at 8 °C. In Japan, it is called 煮凝り (Niko-gori), literally 'boiled then become flocculated/stiffened'. Not intended cooking, occurs naturally in winter, historically tasted.

A common gelling agent in cooking, different types and grades of gelatin are used in a wide range of food and nonfood products. Common examples of foods that contain gelatin are jellos, trifles, aspic, marshmallows, candy corn, and confections such as Peeps, gummy bears, fruit snacks, and jelly babies. Gelatin may be used as a stabilizer, thickener, or texturizer in foods such as yogurt, cream cheese, and margarine; it is used, as well, in fat-reduced foods to simulate the mouthfeel of fat and to create volume. It also is used in the production of several types of Chinese soup dumplings, specifically Shanghainese soup dumplings, or xiaolongbao, as well as Shengjian mantou, a type of fried and steamed dumpling. The fillings of both are made by combining ground pork with gelatin cubes, and in the process of cooking, the gelatin melts, creating a soupy interior with a characteristic gelatinous stickiness.

Gelatin is used for the clarification of juices, such as apple juice, and of vinegar.

Isinglass is obtained from the swim bladders of fish. It is used as a fining agent for wine and beer. Besides hartshorn jelly, from deer antlers (hence the name "hartshorn"), isinglass was one of the oldest sources of gelatin.

=== Binder, emulsifier, and stabilizer ===
Gelatin is used as a carrier or separating agent for other substances. It makes β-carotene water-soluble, thus allowing it to be used as a coloring agent in soft drinks, imparting a yellow color.

Certain professional and theatrical lighting equipment use color gels to change the beam color. Historically, these were made with gelatin, hence the term color gel.

It is used to hold silver halide crystals in an emulsion in virtually all photographic films and photographic papers. Despite significant effort, no suitable substitutes with the stability and low cost of gelatin have been found.

Gelatin is used as a binder in match heads and sandpaper.

The culinary uses in clarification and fining as well as the medical use in drug stabilization are also examples of using gelatin as a emulsifier or a binder.

=== Coating ===
Gelatin was first used as an external surface sizing for paper in 1337 and continued as a dominant sizing agent of all European papers through the mid-nineteenth century. In modern times, it is mostly found in watercolor paper, and occasionally in glossy printing papers, artistic papers, and playing cards. It maintains the wrinkles in crêpe paper.

=== Medicine and cosmetics ===
==== Topical preparations ====
Cosmetics may contain a non-gelling variant of gelatin under the name hydrolyzed collagen (hydrolysate). Hydrolyzed collagen may be found in topical (applied to the skin) creams, acting as a product texture conditioner, and moisturizer.

==== Oral drugs ====
Gelatin is a common excipient in oral pharmaceuticals, both drug and vitamins. It was originally used in the shells of all capsules to make them easier to swallow. Now, a vegetarian-acceptable alternative to gelatin, hypromellose (hydroxypropyl methylcellulose, HPMC), is also used for hard capsules. It is less expensive than gelatin to produce. Modified starch has also been used.

Softgels (soft capsules) remain mostly made of gelatin due to the flexibility needed. The first commercially-viable vegetarian alternative based on carrageenan-modified starch appeared in 2001. Modern ones also use alginate. The production process for vegetarian softgels remain more complicated than gelatin-based ones.

==== Injection stabilizer ====
Gelatin also acts as a stabilizer in vaccines and other injected drugs, helping the mixture stay uniform to maintain effect and consistency. Unfortunately a small portion of the population is allergic to gelatin, leading to a potentially severe systemic reaction when injected. This has led to its voluntary phase-out from vaccines in a number of countries such as Japan.

==== Blood plasma substitute ====
Gelatin may be used as a blood plasma substitute – a colloid volume expander – to treat hypovolemic shock caused by conditions such as burns or as a short-term treatment when more appropriate blood products are not immediately available.

==== Implants ====
Collagen implants or dermal fillers are also used to address the appearance of wrinkles, contour deficiencies, and acne scars, among others. The U.S. Food and Drug Administration has approved its use, and identifies cow (bovine) and human cells as the sources of these fillers. According to the FDA, the desired effects can last for 3–4 months, which is relatively the most short-lived compared to other materials used for the same purpose.

=== Biotechnology ===
Gelatin is also used in synthesizing hydrogels for tissue engineering applications. Its collagen-like structure makes it a useful extracellular matrix in 3D cell culture.

Gelatin is also used as a saturating agent in immunoassays, and as a coat.

Gelatin degradation assay allows visualizing and quantifying invasion at the subcellular level instead of analyzing the invasive behavior of whole cells, for the study of cellular protrusions called invadopodia and podosomes, which are protrusive structures in cancer cells and play an important role in cell attachment and remodeling of the extracellular matrix (ECM).

=== Other technical uses ===
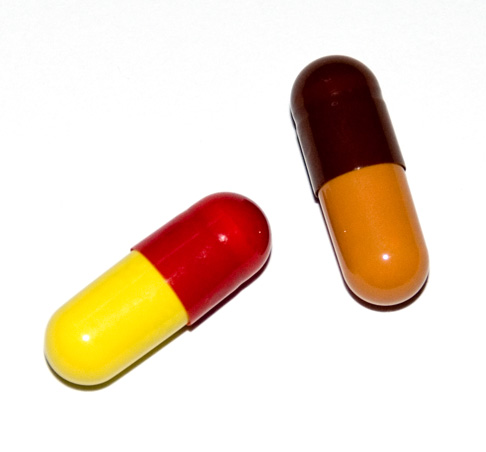
Capsules made of gelatin.

- Some animal glues such as hide glue may be unrefined gelatin.
- Ballistic gelatin is used to test and measure the performance of bullets shot from firearms.

== Gelatin derivatives ==
Gelatin methacryloyl (GelMA) is a chemically modified derivative of gelatin, produced by introducing methacryloyl functional groups onto gelatin's amine and hydroxyl residues. This modification allows GelMA to undergo photocrosslinking in the presence of a photoinitiator, forming stable hydrogels with tunable mechanical properties. Additionally, the introduction of methacrylated groups enhances GelMA's mucoadhesive properties, making it particularly useful for mucosal drug delivery applications. Due to its biocompatibility, biodegradability, and ability to mimic the extracellular matrix, GelMA has gained widespread applications in tissue engineering, drug delivery, and biofabrication. It is particularly useful in 3D bioprinting, wound healing, and the development of organ-on-a-chip models. Its capacity to support cell adhesion, proliferation, and differentiation further makes it an attractive biomaterial for regenerative medicine and biomedical research.

== Religious considerations ==
The consumption of gelatin from particular animals may be forbidden by religious rules or cultural taboos.

Islamic halal and Jewish kosher customs generally require gelatin from sources other than pigs, such as cattle that have been slaughtered according to religious regulations (halal or kosher), or fish (that Jews and Muslims are allowed to consume).

On the other hand, Islamic jurists participating in a 1995 seminar held in Kuwait by the Islamic Organization for Medical Sciences have argued that the chemical treatment "purifies" or "transforms" the gelatin enough to always be halal. Furthermore, the principle of General Inescapable Necessity ('Umum al-Balwa) of the Sharia allows for even "non-purified" substances such as insulin derived from pig pancreas to be used when no alternative is immediately available. The same principle allows for using alcohol as a solvent in the production of food, with the added factor that very little alcohol actually remains in the product due to evaporation.

It has similarly been argued that gelatin in medicine is permissible in Judaism, as it is not used as food. Orthodox Halachic opinions differ as to whether gelatin from non-kosher animals may be permitted to be used in regular food production, though the broad consensus among Orthodox kashrut authorities categorize it as non-kosher. Alternatives, such as gelatin from kosher animals and fish, despite being more expensive, are generally considered cost-effective due to the large market for kosher foods. According to The Jewish Dietary Laws, the book of kosher guidelines published by the Rabbinical Assembly, the organization of Conservative Jewish rabbis, all gelatin is kosher and pareve because the chemical transformation undergone in the manufacturing process renders it a different physical and chemical substance.

Buddhist, Hindu, and Jain customs may require gelatin alternatives from sources other than animals, as many Hindus, almost all Jains and some Buddhists are vegetarian.

== See also ==
- Agar
- Carrageenan
- Konjac
- Pectin
- Gulaman
