= Mosaic gelatin =

South American dessert

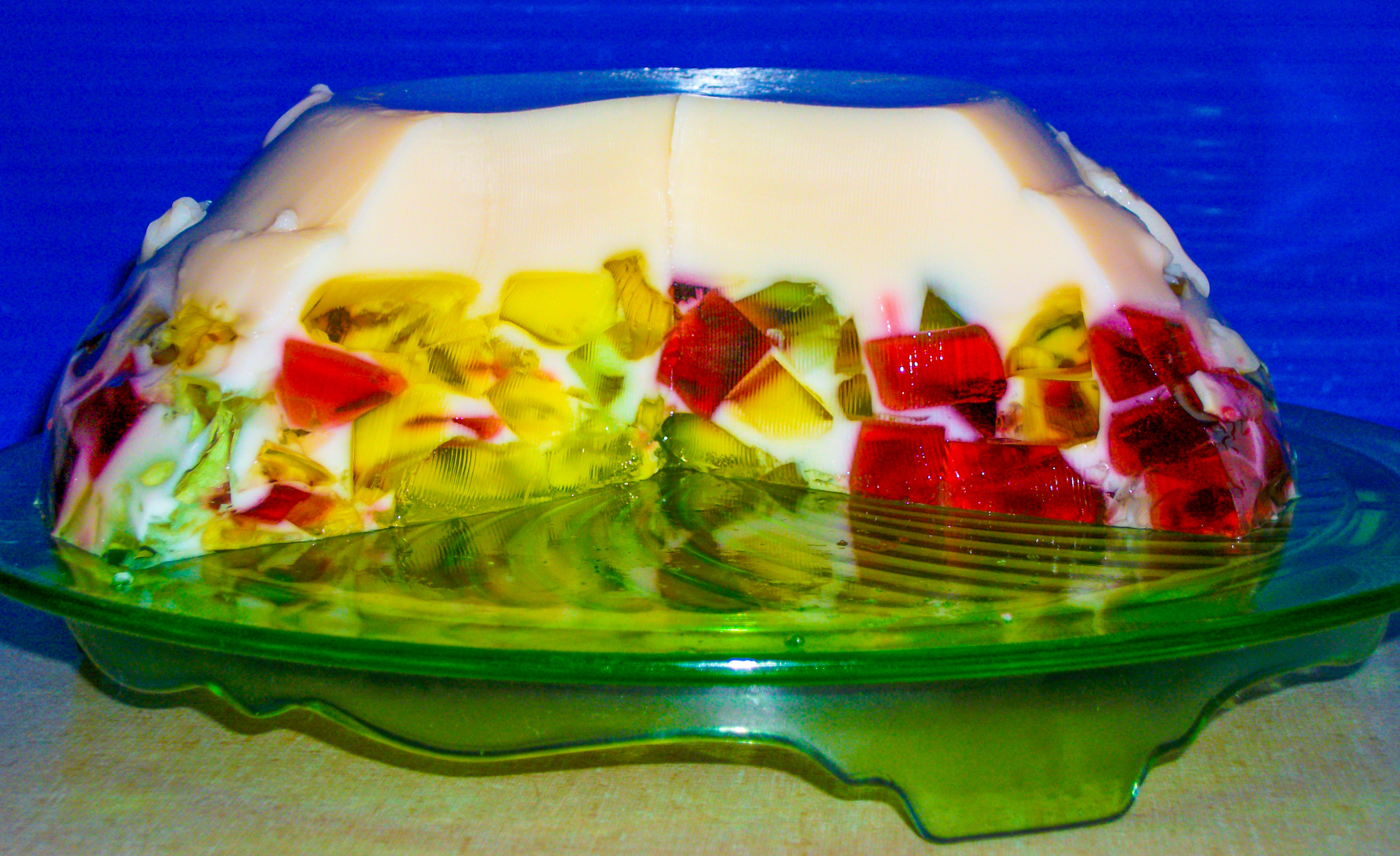
- Alternative names: Broken glass gelatin, stained glass gelatin
- Type: Dessert
- Place of origin: Mexico, Brazil
- Main ingredients: Gelatin (flavored and unflavored), Milk (condensed and evaporated)

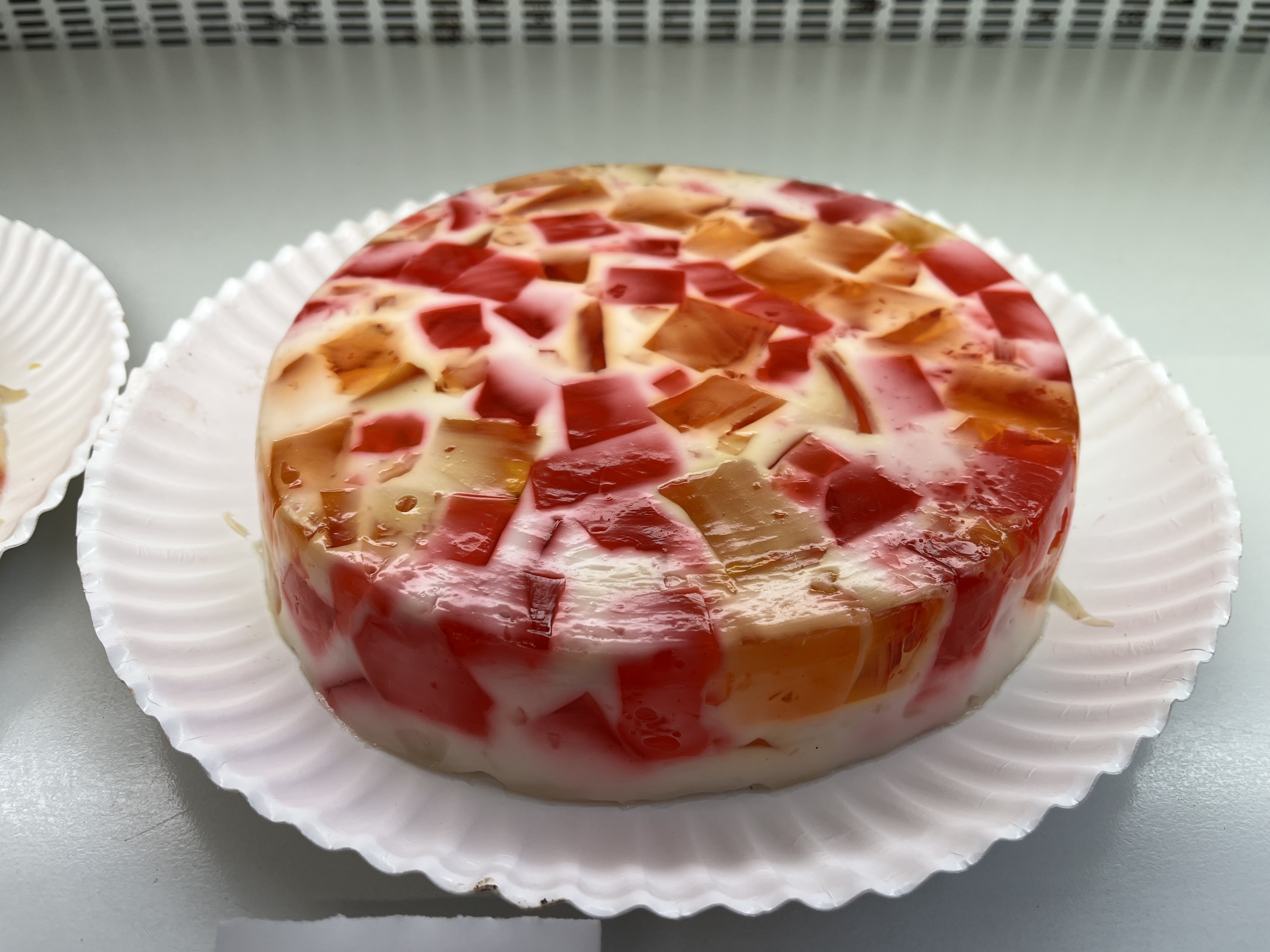
Mosaic gelatin

Mosaic gelatin is a gelatin dessert that is popular in Mexico and Brazil. However, it is unclear if it is of Mexican or Brazilian origin. It is sometimes called broken or stained glass gelatin due to its appearance. This dessert is sold at fairs, markets, plazas, and food carts. It can even be found in upscale restaurants. It is popular amongst individuals of all ages, but particularly children because of its colorful, attractive appearance. It can be served at special occasions, and is often found at birthday parties for children. It is a relatively simple and inexpensive dessert to prepare.

It is related to or derived from an American recipe, crown jewel dessert, submitted by R.J. Gatti to General Foods, the maker of Jello in 1955. This recipe, as published in 1962, used a binder of whipped cream mixed with a partially-set lemon gelatine prepared with pineapple juice.

Traditionally, there are two types of gelatin. One is a milk based and the other is water or fruit juice based. The most characteristic representation of mosaic gelatin is pieces of colored, flavored gelatin scattered in a background of white, milk gelatin.

It is prepared by combining multiple cubes of flavored gelatin with a blended mixture of unflavored gelatin and milk (evaporated and condensed). Prior to adding the milk, the unflavored gelatin is allowed to cool. Otherwise, it will curdle the milk. The gelatin is cooled for several hours to create a firm texture.

Nevertheless, there is wide variation in how the dish is prepared. The gelatin can have either a water or a milk base. The gelatin itself can be of a single flavor or multiple flavors. The gelatin can have elaborate designs such as flowers, hearts, or butterflies. Sometimes, fresh fruit is added. A bundt pan can be used to mold the gelatin.

In Mexico, lime (green) and strawberry (red) are the most common flavors. In combination with the white milk gelatin, it represents the colors of the Mexican flag. Other popular flavors are grape (purple), lemon (green), blueberries (blue), orange (orange), and pineapple (yellow).

Powdered fruit-flavored gelatin was introduced to Brazil at the beginning of the 20th century, and since then it has become quite popular.

== See also ==
- Gelatin dessert
