= Jean Darcet =

French chemist (1724–1801)

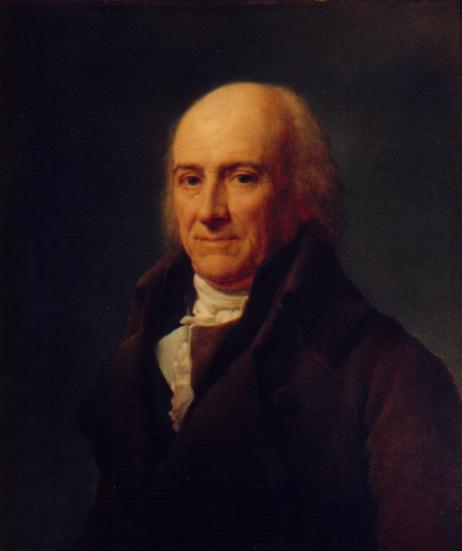
- Jean Darcet.
- Born: 7 September 1724; Doazit, Kingdom of France
- Died: 12 February 1801 (aged 76); Paris, French First Republic
- Occupation: French chemist

Jean d'Arcet or Jean Darcet (7 September 1724 – 12 February 1801) was a French chemist, and director of the porcelain works at Sèvres. He was among the first to manufacture hard porcelain in France and helped reduce imports and establish the ceramic industry at Sévres. He is also remembered in Darcet's alloy, a mix of bismuth, lead and tin that melted easily (at 98°C) and was used for low-cost dental filling and other applications. His son Jean-Pierre-Joseph d'Arcet (1777-1844) also became a chemist.

== Life and work ==
Darcet was probably born at Audignon, near Doazit, where his family resided, but was baptised in Audignon. His father François, a judge, was married to Marguerite d’Audignon. His mother died in 1728 and his father married Jeanne d’Arbins. Darcet went to study theology at d'Aire in 1736 and in 1740 he moved to study medicine at Bordeaux while his father wished that he had studied law, leading to his being denied an inheritance, which instead went to the Darcet's step-siblings. Darcet then earned a living by teaching Greek and Latin. A friend Augustin Roux (1726-1776) introduced him to Charles de Secondat Montesquieu (1689-1775) whose son, Jean-Baptist Secondat (1797-1871), needed a tutor. He completed his studies at Bordeaux and received a medical degree in 1762 and was appointed Docteur Régent (a teaching license) at the Faculty of Medicine. He attended chemistry courses at the Jardin du Roi given by Guillaume François Rouelle (1703-1770). He was approached by Comte Louis de Lauraguais (1733-1824), a nobleman and entrepreneur who sought to reduce French dependence on porcelain imports from China and Japan. Lauraguais had Darcet advice him on the manufacture of hard porcelain. They examined many clays, minerals and metal oxides and were finally able to produce a hard porcelain used kaolin from St-Yrieix. They patented their method in England in 1766 but it was not really made use of. Several others also developed techniques from similar raw materials and an industry grew at Limoges. In 1774, Darcet was appointed professor of chemistry in the Collège de France. Darcet began to make use of French in his chemistry teaching and he was able to set up an experimental laboratory thanks to the ministers Anne Robert Jacques Turgot (1727-1781) and Chrétien Guillaume de Malesherbes (1721-1794). He used Jérôme Dizet (1764-1852) as an assistant for his lectures. He taught for 27 years. In 1785 the government established the Institute de France and he was made a member. In 1784 he was appointed chemist at the Academy of Science to succeed Pierre-Joseph Macquer (1718-1784).

Darcet also worked on various other topics. He was interested in the geology of the Pyrenees. He demonstrated that diamonds could be completely combusted in a furnace with no residue unlike other precious stones such as rubies and emeralds. He examined the manufacture of soaps with different oils and fats in 1797. He also worked on metallurgy in 1775 and was able to find a metal alloy that melted at a temperature lower than that of water. Darcet's alloy was made up of tin, bismuth and lead. Some of the alloys found application for safety valves in steam engines. He was made member of a Royal Commission on Animal Magnetism.

Because the Duke of Orleans had financed part of Darcet's research in porcelain, he was added to the list of suspects to be guillotined during the revolution. The duke himself was guillotined. Antoine-François Fourcroy (1750-1809) however intervened and explained the nature of the relationship to Maximilien Robespierre (1758-1794) and he was saved. The family however had to hide for some time at Prouilh.

Darcet married Françoise Amélie, the daughter of Guillaume Rouelle in 1771. They had two sons and two daughters. Their son Jean-Pierre-Joseph d'Arcet (1777-1844) became a chemist. He died in Paris, possibly from gout.

Darcet's major publications include: Sur l'action d'un feu égal sur un grand nombre de terres (1766–71); Expériences sur plusieurs diamants et pierres précieuses (1772); Rapport sur l'electricité dans les maladies nerveuses (1783).
