= Gelatine dessert =

Dessert made with gelatin

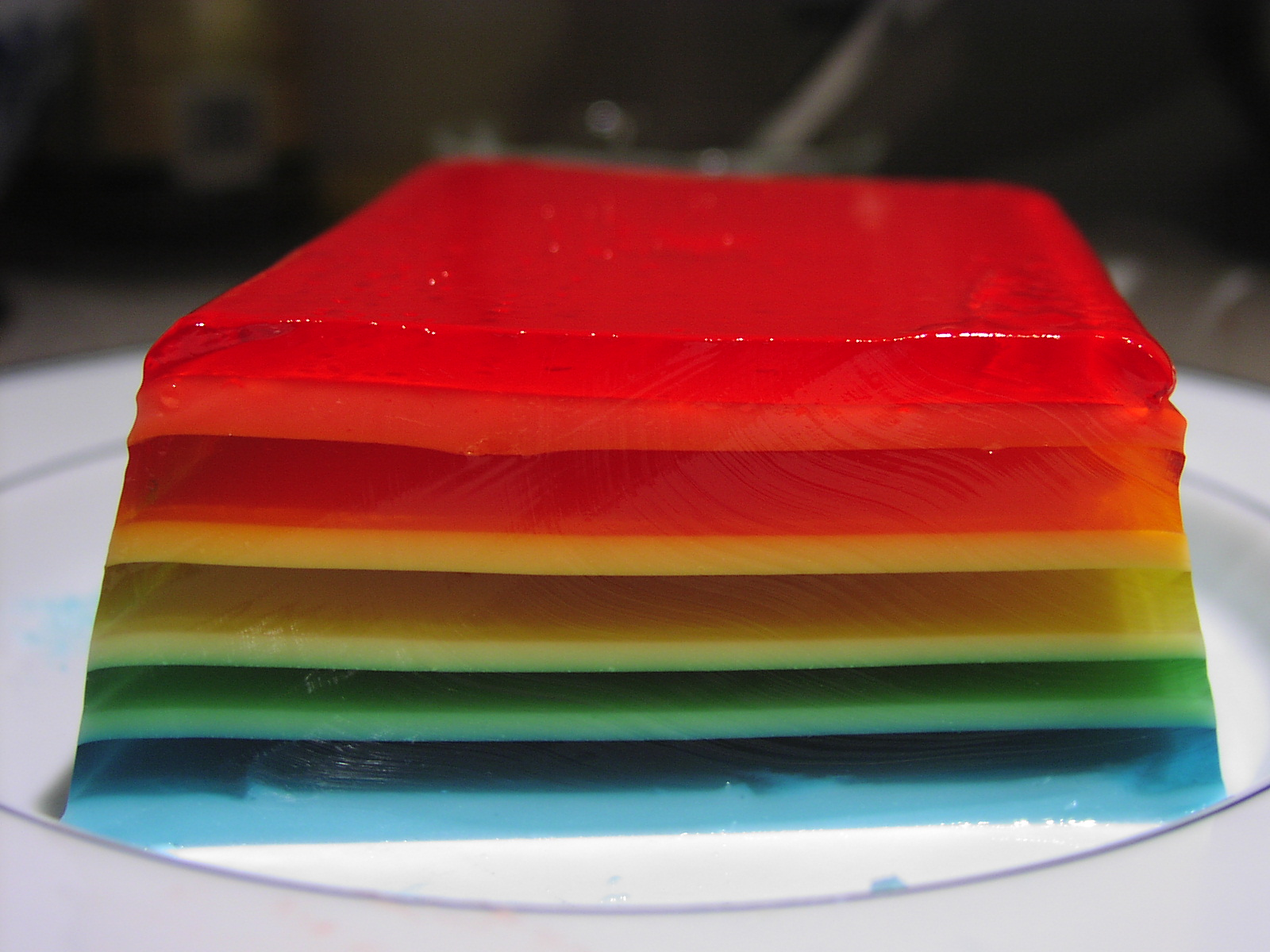
- A multi-coloured layered gelatine-based dessert.
- Type: Dessert
- Place of origin: United Kingdom
- Serving temperature: Chilled
- Main ingredients: Gelatine

Gelatine desserts (British English) or gelatin desserts (American English) are desserts made with a sweetened and flavoured processed collagen product (gelatine), which makes the dessert "set" from a liquid to a soft elastic solid gel. This kind of dessert was first recorded as "jelly" by Hannah Glasse in her 18th-century book The Art of Cookery, appearing in a layer of trifle. Jelly recipes are included in the 19th-century cookbooks of the English food writers Eliza Acton and Isabella Beeton.

Jelly can be made by combining plain gelatine with other ingredients or by using a premixed blend of gelatine with additives. Fully prepared gelatine desserts are sold in a variety of forms, ranging from large decorative shapes to individual serving cups.

In the United States and Canada, this dessert is known by the genericised trademark "jello".

== History ==
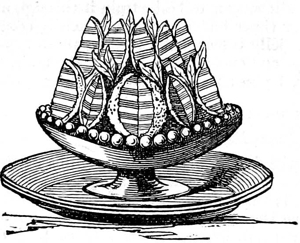
Wood-engraving of "Orange Jellies" garnished with myrtle leaves, in Eliza Acton's Modern Cookery for Private Families, 1845.

Before gelatine became widely available as a commercial product, the most typical gelatine dessert was "calf's foot jelly". As the name indicates, this was made by extracting and purifying gelatine from the foot of a calf. This gelatine was used for savoury dishes in aspic, or was mixed with fruit juice and sugar for a dessert.

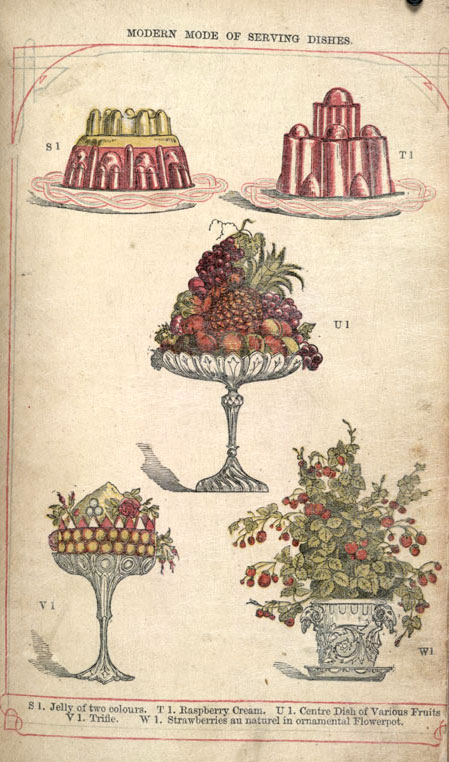
Illustrations of jelly (top row) from Isabella Beeton's Book of Household Management, 1861. Top left, "jelly of two colours", top right, "raspberry cream" flavour

In the eighteenth century, gelatine from calf's feet, isinglass and hartshorn was coloured blue with violet juice, yellow with saffron, red with cochineal and green with spinach and allowed to set in layers in small, narrow glasses. It was flavoured with sugar, lemon juice and mixed spices. This preparation was called jelly; the English cookery writer Hannah Glasse was the first to record the use of this jelly in trifle in her book The Art of Cookery, first published in 1747. Preparations on making jelly (including illustrations) appear in the best selling cookbooks of the English writers Eliza Acton and Isabella Beeton in the 19th century.

Due to the time-consuming nature of extracting gelatine from animal bones, gelatine desserts were a status symbol up until the mid-19th century as it indicated a large kitchen staff. Jelly molds were very common in the batteries de cuisine of stately homes.

== Preparation ==
To make a gelatine dessert, gelatine is dissolved in hot liquid with the desired flavours and other additives. These latter ingredients usually include sugar, fruit juice, or sugar substitutes; they may be added and varied during preparation, or pre-mixed with the gelatine in a commercial product which mainly requires the addition of hot water.

In addition to sweeteners, the prepared commercial blends generally contain flavouring agents and other additives, such as adipic acid, fumaric acid, sodium citrate, and artificial flavourings and food colours. Because the collagen is processed extensively, the final product is not categorised as a meat or animal product by the United States federal government.

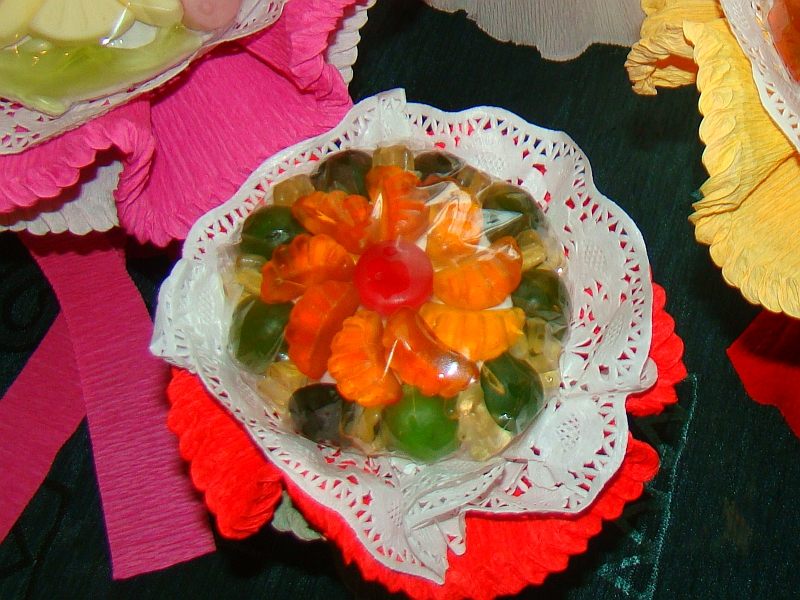
A gelatine dessert containing pieces of fruit

Prepared commercial blends may be sold as a powder or as a concentrated gelatinous block, divided into small squares. Either type is mixed with sufficient hot water to completely dissolve it, and then mixed with enough cold water to make the volume of liquid specified on the packet.

The solubility of powdered gelatine can be enhanced by sprinkling it into the liquid several minutes before heating, "blooming" the individual granules. The fully dissolved mixture is then refrigerated, slowly forming a colloidal gel as it cools.

Gelatine desserts may be enhanced in many ways, such as using decorative moulds, creating multicoloured layers by adding a new layer of slightly cooled liquid over the previously solidified one, or suspending non-soluble edible elements such as marshmallows or fruit. Some types of fresh fruit and their unprocessed juices are incompatible with gelatine desserts; see the Chemistry section below.

When fully chilled, the most common ratios of gelatine to liquid (as instructed on commercial packaging) usually result in a custard-like texture which can retain detailed shapes when cold but melts back to a viscous liquid when warm. A recipe calling for the addition of additional gelatine to regular jelly gives a rubbery product that can be cut into shapes with cookie cutters and eaten with fingers (called "Knox Blox" by the Knox company, makers of unflavoured gelatine). Higher gelatine ratios can be used to increase the stability of the gel, culminating in gummy candies which remain rubbery solids at room temperature (see Bloom (test)).

Packets of Rowntree's jelly cubes, now manufactured by Hartley's

The bloom strength of a gelatine mixture is the measure of how strong it is. It is defined by the force in grams required to press a 12.5 mm (0.49 in) diameter plunger 4 mm (0.16 in) into 112 g (4.0 oz) of a standard 6.67% w/v gelatine gel at 10 °C (50 °F). The bloom strength of a gel is useful to know when determining the possibility of substituting a gelatine of one bloom strength for a gelatine of another. One can use the following equation: $C \times \sqrt{B} = k$ or $\frac{C_1\sqrt{B_1}}{\sqrt{B_2}} = C_2$ where $C$ is the concentration, $B$ is the bloom strength, $k$ is a constant. For example, when making gummies, it is important to know that a 250 bloom gelatine has a much shorter (more thick) texture than a 180 bloom gelatine.

=== Gelatine shots ===
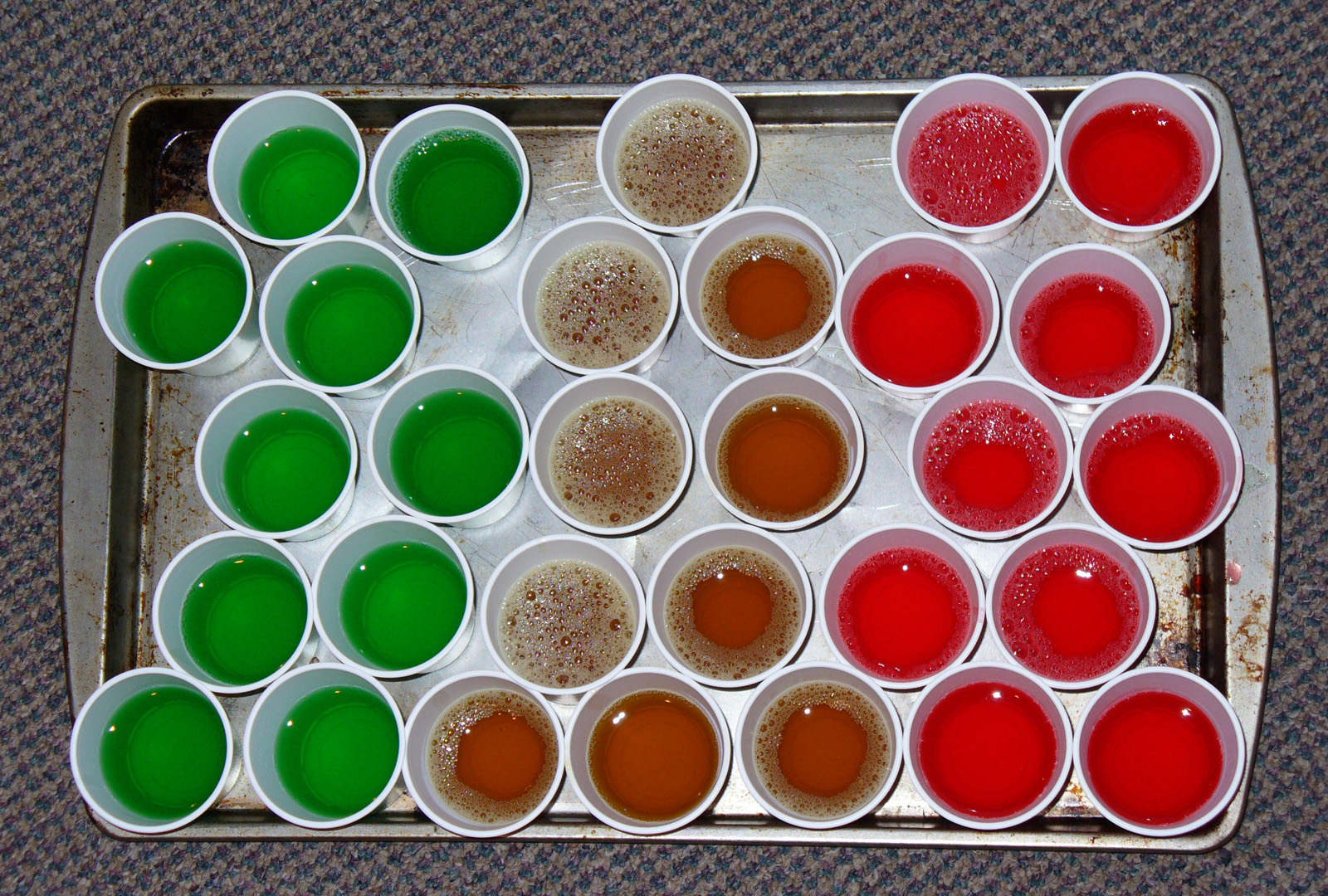
A tray of gelatine shots prior to refrigeration

A gelatine shot (usually called a Jell-O shot in North America and vodka jelly or jelly shot in the UK and Australia) is a shooter in which one or more liquors, usually vodka, rum, tequila, or neutral grain spirit, replaces some of the water or fruit juice that is used to congeal the gel.

The American satirist and mathematician Tom Lehrer claims to have invented the gelatine shot in the 1950s while working for the National Security Agency, where he developed vodka gelatine as a way to circumvent a restriction of alcoholic beverages on base. An early published recipe for an alcoholic gelatine drink dates from 1862, found in How to Mix Drinks, or The Bon Vivant's Companion by Jerry Thomas: his recipe for "Punch Jelly" calls for the addition of isinglass or other gelatine to a punch made from cognac, rum, and lemon juice.

=== Gelatine art desserts ===
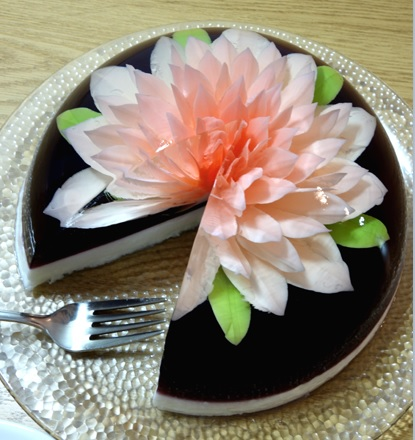
A flower made of gelatine

Gelatine art desserts, also known as 3D gelatine desserts, are made by injecting colourful shapes into a flavoured gelatine base. Creations by Lourdes Reyes Rosas of Mexico City kicked off the growth in popularity of this 3D gelation art technique in the early 1990s, which spread to Western and Pacific countries.

These desserts are made using high-quality gelatine that has a high bloom value and low odour and taste. The clear gelatine base is prepared using gelatine, water, sugar, citric acid and food flavouring.

When the clear gelatine base sets, colourful shapes are injected using a syringe.

The injected material usually consists of a sweetener (most commonly sugar), some type of edible liquid (milk, cream, water, etc.), food colouring and a thickening agent such as starch or additional gelatine.

The shapes are drawn by making incisions in the clear gelatine base using sharp objects. Coloured liquid is then allowed to fill the crevice and make the cut shape visible.

Most commonly, the shapes are drawn using sterile medical needles or specialised pre-cut gelatine art tools that allow the shape to be cut and filled with colour at the same time.

Gelatine art tools are attached to a syringe and used to inject a predetermined shape into gelatine.

When combined with other ingredients, such as whipping cream or mousse, gelatine art desserts can be assembled into formations resembling a cake.

=== Gelatine substitutes ===
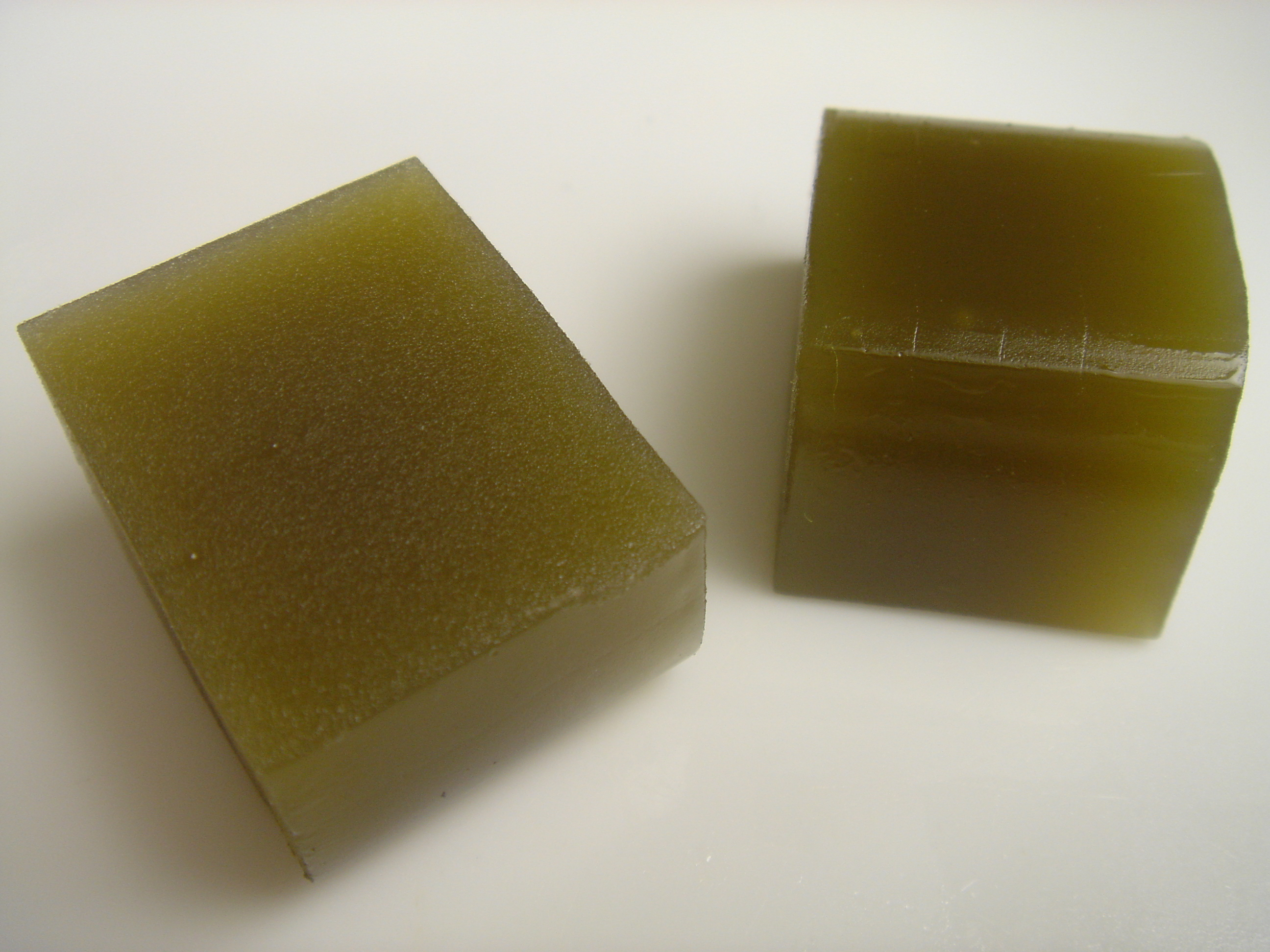
Green tea flavoured yōkan, a popular Japanese red bean jelly made from agar

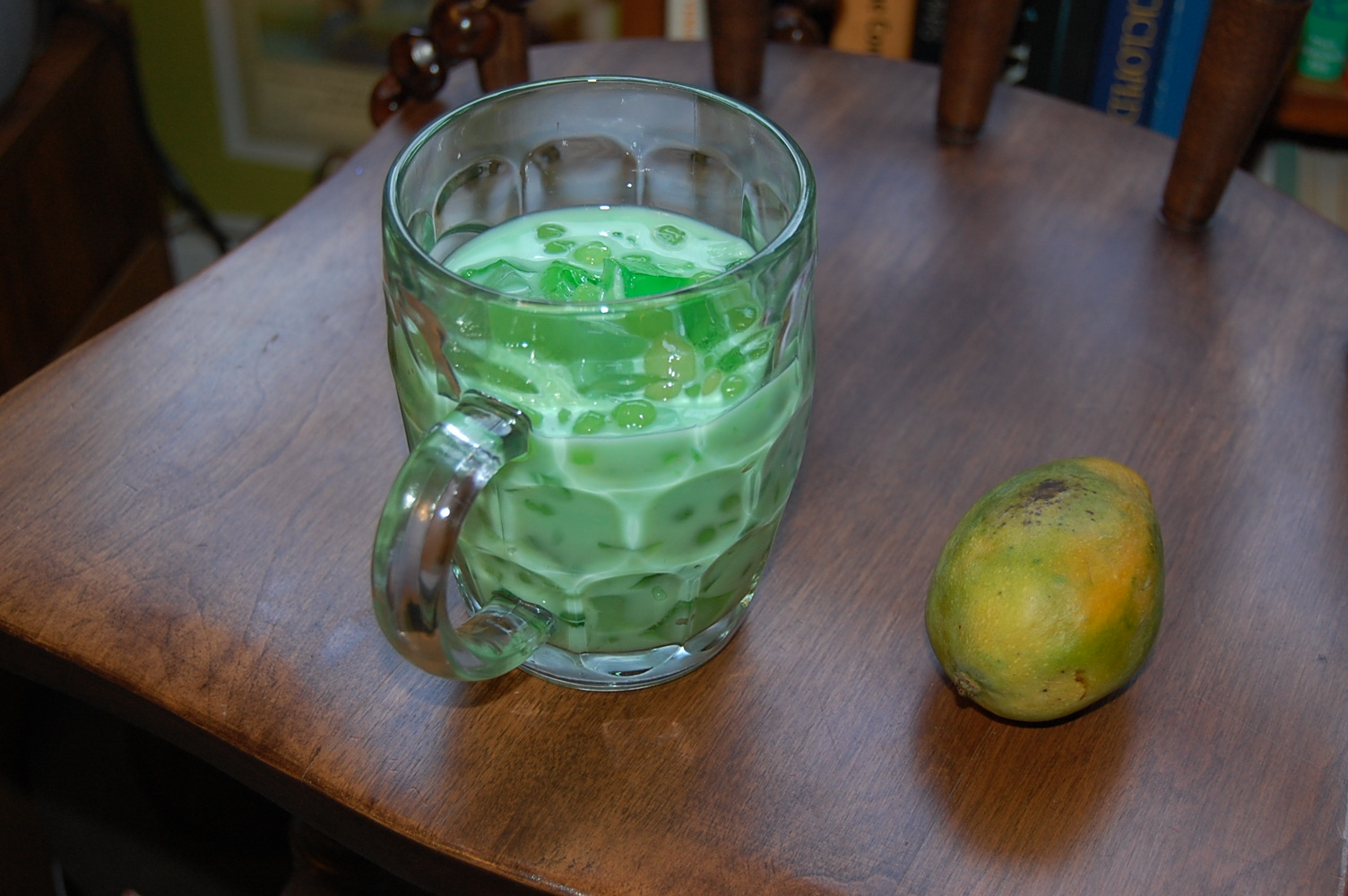
Buko pandan, a dessert beverage from the Philippines made with pandan-flavoured cubes of gulaman, a traditional gelatine-substitute made from carrageenan

Other culinary gelling agents can be used instead of animal-derived gelatine. These plant-derived substances are more similar to pectin and other gelling plant carbohydrates than to gelatine proteins; their physical properties are slightly different, creating different constraints for the preparation and storage conditions. These other gelling agents may also be preferred for certain traditional cuisines or dietary restrictions.

Agar, a product made from red algae, is the traditional gelling agent in many Asian desserts. Agar is a popular gelatine substitute in quick jelly powder mix and prepared dessert gels that can be stored at room temperature. Compared to gelatine, agar preparations require a higher dissolving temperature, but the resulting gels congeal more quickly and remain solid at higher temperatures, 40 °C (104 °F), as opposed to 15 °C (59 °F) for gelatine. Vegans and vegetarians can use agar to replace animal-derived gelatine.

Another common seaweed-based gelatine substitute is carrageenan, which has been used as a food additive since ancient times. It was first industrially-produced in the Philippines, which pioneered the cultivation of tropical red seaweed species (primarily Eucheuma and Kappaphycus spp.) from where carrageenan is extracted. The Philippines produces 80% of the world's carrageenan supply. Carrageenan gelatine substitute are traditionally known as gulaman in the Philippines. It is widely used in various traditional desserts and are sold as dried bars or in powder form. Unlike gelatine, gulaman sets at room temperature and is uniquely thermo-reversible. If melted at higher temperatures, it can revert to its original shape once cooled down. Carrageenan jelly also sets more firmly than agar and lacks agar's occasionally unpleasant smell during cooking. The use of carrageenan as a gelatine substitute has spread to other parts of the world, particularly in cuisines with dietary restrictions against gelatine, like kosher and halal cooking. It has also been used in prepackaged Jello shots to make them shelf stable at room temperatures.

Konjac is a gelling agent used in many Asian foods, including the popular konnyaku fruit jelly candies.

== Chemistry ==
Strawberry jelly with strawberries

Gelatine consists of partially hydrolysed collagen, a protein which is highly abundant in animal tissues such as bone and skin. Collagen is a protein made up of three strands of polypeptide chains that form in a helical structure. To make a gelatine dessert, the collagen is mixed with water and heated, disrupting the bonds that hold the three strands of polypeptides together. As the gelatine cools, these bonds try to reform in the same structure as before, but now with small bubbles of liquid in between. This gives gelatine its semisolid, gel-like texture.

Because gelatine is a protein that contains both acid and base amino groups, it acts as an amphoteric molecule, displaying both acidic and basic properties. This allows it to react with different compounds, such as sugars and other food additives. These interactions give gelatine a versatile nature in the roles that it plays in different foods. It can stabilise foams in foods such as marshmallows, it can help to maintain small ice crystals in ice cream, and it can even serve as an emulsifier for foods like toffee and margarine.

Although many gelatine desserts incorporate fruit, some fresh fruits contain proteolytic enzymes; these enzymes cut the gelatine molecule into peptides (protein fragments) too small to form a firm gel. The use of such fresh fruits in a gelatine recipe results in a dessert that never "sets".

Specifically, pineapple contains the protease (protein cutting enzyme) bromelain, kiwifruit contains actinidin, figs contain ficain, and papaya contains papain. Cooking or canning denatures and deactivates the proteases, so canned pineapple, for example, works fine in a gelatine dessert.

== Legal definitions and regulations ==
=== China ===
Gelatine dessert in China is defined as edible jelly-like food prepared from a mixture of water, sugar and gelling agent. The preparation processes include concocting, gelling, sterilising and packaging. In China, around 250 legal additives are allowed in gelatine desserts as gelling agents, colours, artificial sweeteners, emulsifiers and antioxidants.

Gelatine desserts are classified into 5 categories according to the different flavouring substances they contain. Five types of flavouring substance include artificial fruit flavoured type (less than 15% of natural fruit juice), natural fruit flavoured type (above 15% of natural fruit juice), natural flavoured with fruit pulp type and dairy type products, which includes dairy ingredients. The last type ("others") summarises gelatine desserts not mentioned above. It is typically sold in single-serving plastic cups or plastic food bags.

== Safety ==
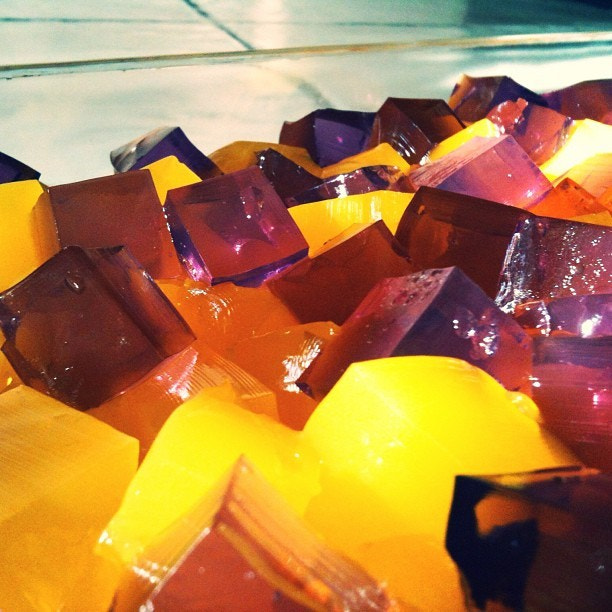
Jelly cubes

Although eating tainted beef can lead to New Variant Creutzfeldt-Jakob disease (the human variant of mad-cow disease, bovine spongiform encephalopathy), there is no known case of BSE having been transmitted through collagen products such as gelatine.

== Jelly worldwide ==
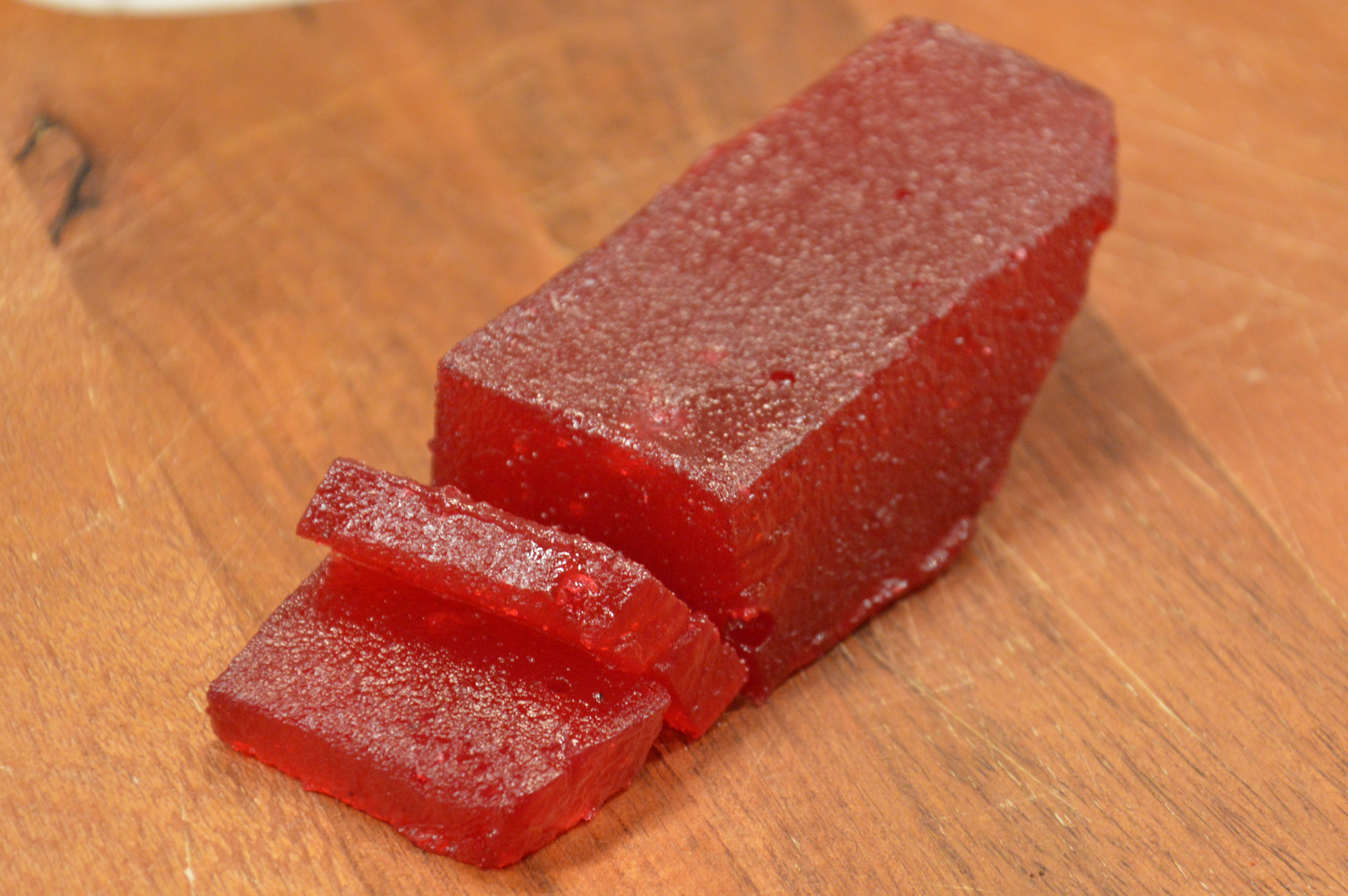
Hitlerszalonna

- Aam papad, a mango preserve from the Indian subcontinent
- Aiyu jelly, a jelly made from the gel from the seeds of the awkeotsang creeping fig found in Taiwan and East Asian countries.
- Almond jelly, a sweet dessert from Hong Kong
- Bocadillo, a Latin American confectionery made with guava pulp and panela
- Cedrate fruit, from Northern Iran, is made into a jam called morabbā-ye bālang
- Chakkavaratti, a Southern Indian jackfruit preserve made with jaggery.
- Coffee jelly features in many desserts in Japan
- Jellied cranberry sauce is primarily a holiday treat in the US and the UK.
- Götterspeise, a German dessert made of gelatine or other gelling agent
- Grass jelly, a food from China and Southeast Asia, often served in drinks
- Hitlerszalonna ('Hitler's bacon'), sold today as gyümölcs íz. The original name comes from the scarcity of real bacon during wartime. This dense fruit jam was eaten by Hungarian troops and civilians during World War II. It was made from mixed fruits such as plum and sold in brick-shaped blocks.
- Konjac, a variety of Japanese jelly made from konnyaku
- Jell-O was named the official snack food of the US state of Utah in 2001. A bowl of lime-flavoured gelatine was featured on a pin for the 2002 Winter Olympics held in Salt Lake City.
- Mayhaw jelly is a delicacy in parts of the American South.
- Muk, a variety of Korean jelly, seasoned and eaten as a cold salad
- Nata de coco, jelly made from coconuts originating from the Philippines
- Turkish delight, a jelly type of Turkish dessert
- Yōkan, a sweet, pasty jelly dessert from Japan often made with beans, sweet potato or squash

== See also ==
- Aspic
- Jello salad, a variation on gelatine desserts that include other ingredients
- Jelly bean
- List of desserts
