= Szalonna (bacon) =

Hungarian bacon

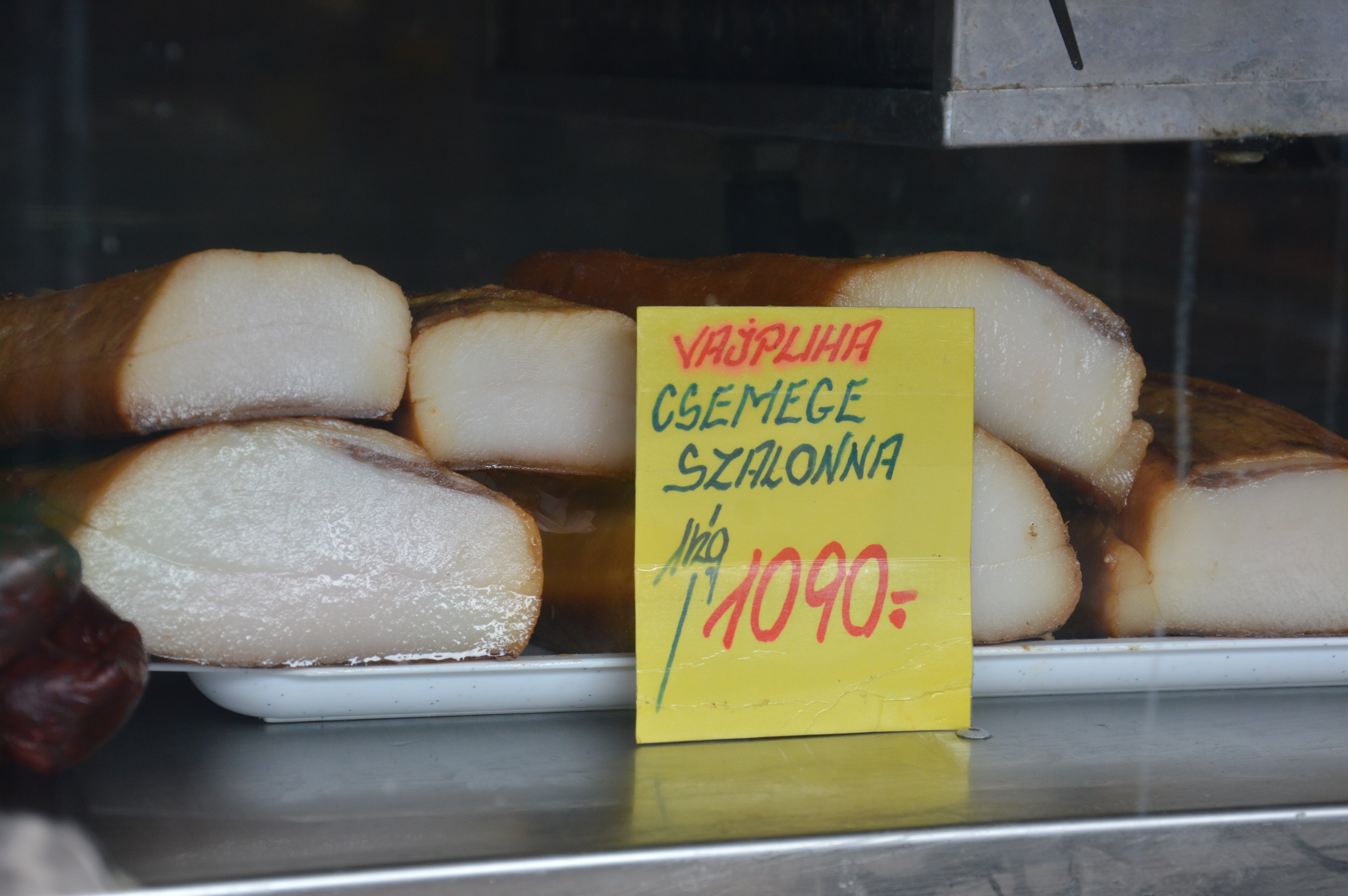
Szalonna

Szalonna (Hungarian pronunciation: [ˈsɒlonːɒ]) is Hungarian for fatback made of smoked pork fat with the rind and is traditional in Hungarian cuisine.

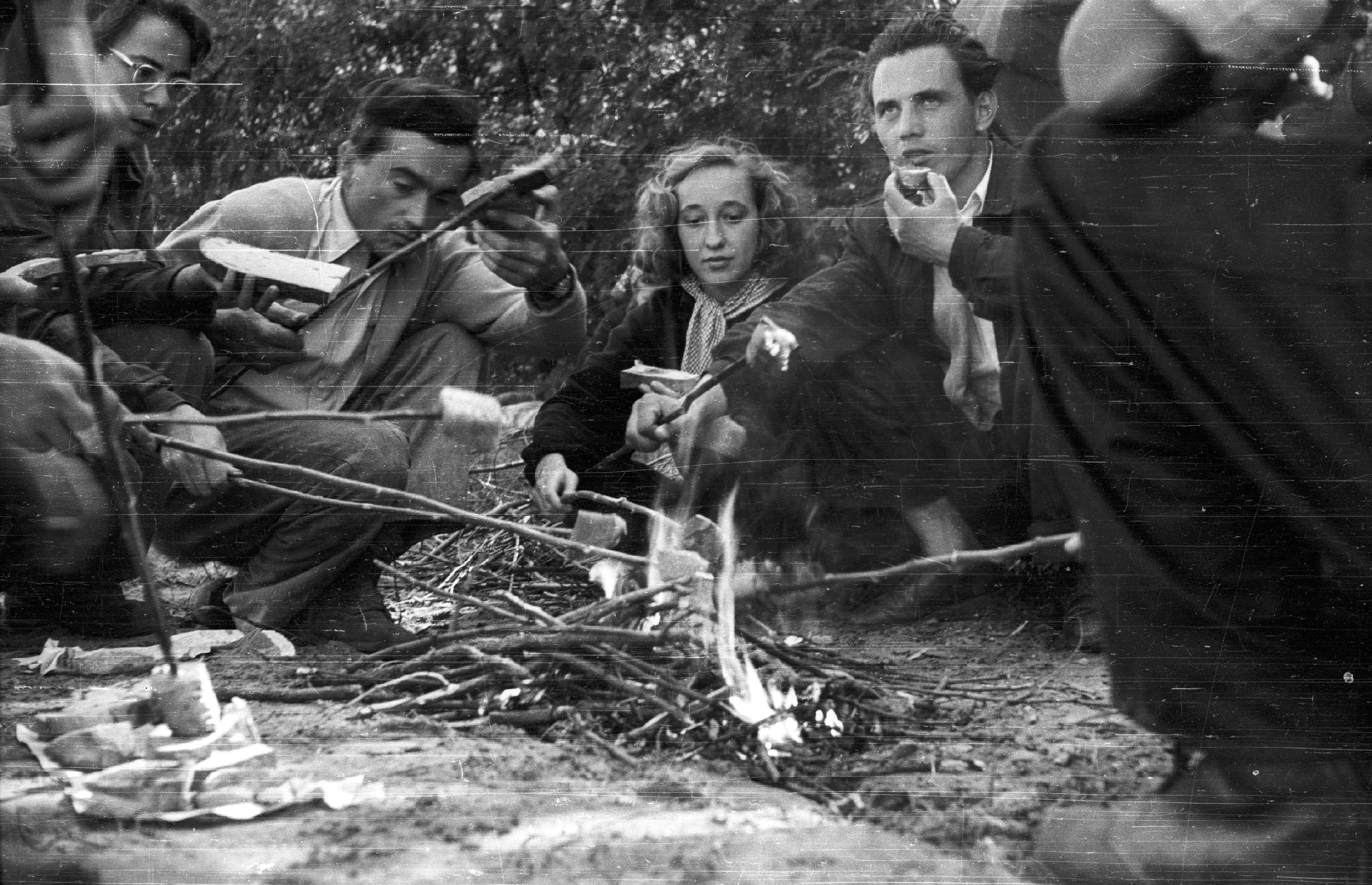
Szalonna roast

Szalonna can be cooked over a pit. This involves cutting the szalonna into long chunks or cubes, spearing them, and roasting them over an open fire. The szalonna cooks to be somewhat crispy and is then eaten with other dishes or alone. Once it starts to sizzle and drip with fat, the szalonna is removed from the fire and the fat is allowed to drip onto a slice of freshly baked bread. The szalonna is returned to the fire and the process is repeated until the piece of bread is nearly saturated with fat from the szalonna. Sliced cucumber, red onion, green peppers, sliced radishes, paprika, other vegetables, ground pepper, and salt are used to add flavor to the slice of bread, and then more drippings are followed to top it off. Periodically, the charred remains are scraped off of the szalonna and are used as an additional topping. This dish was considered to be peasants' food since the most important aspect was the fat, discarded by wealthier Hungarians.

Preparation, cooking and serving remain a longstanding summer tradition among even second and third generation American Hungarians. The szalonna (or "greasy" or "dirty") bread is often served with brandy or beer; in many families, "Opening Day" has become a rite of passage for families of American-Hungarian descent, where traditional family stories and customs are shared as a part of the meal. Young children are given their first taste of the bread at that time.

During and after World War II, a hard fruit slab that could be sliced was referred to as Hitlerszalonna. It was eaten as a provision for soldiers and among civilians.

== See also ==
- Salo (food)
- List of smoked foods
