= Felix d'Arcet =

French chemist

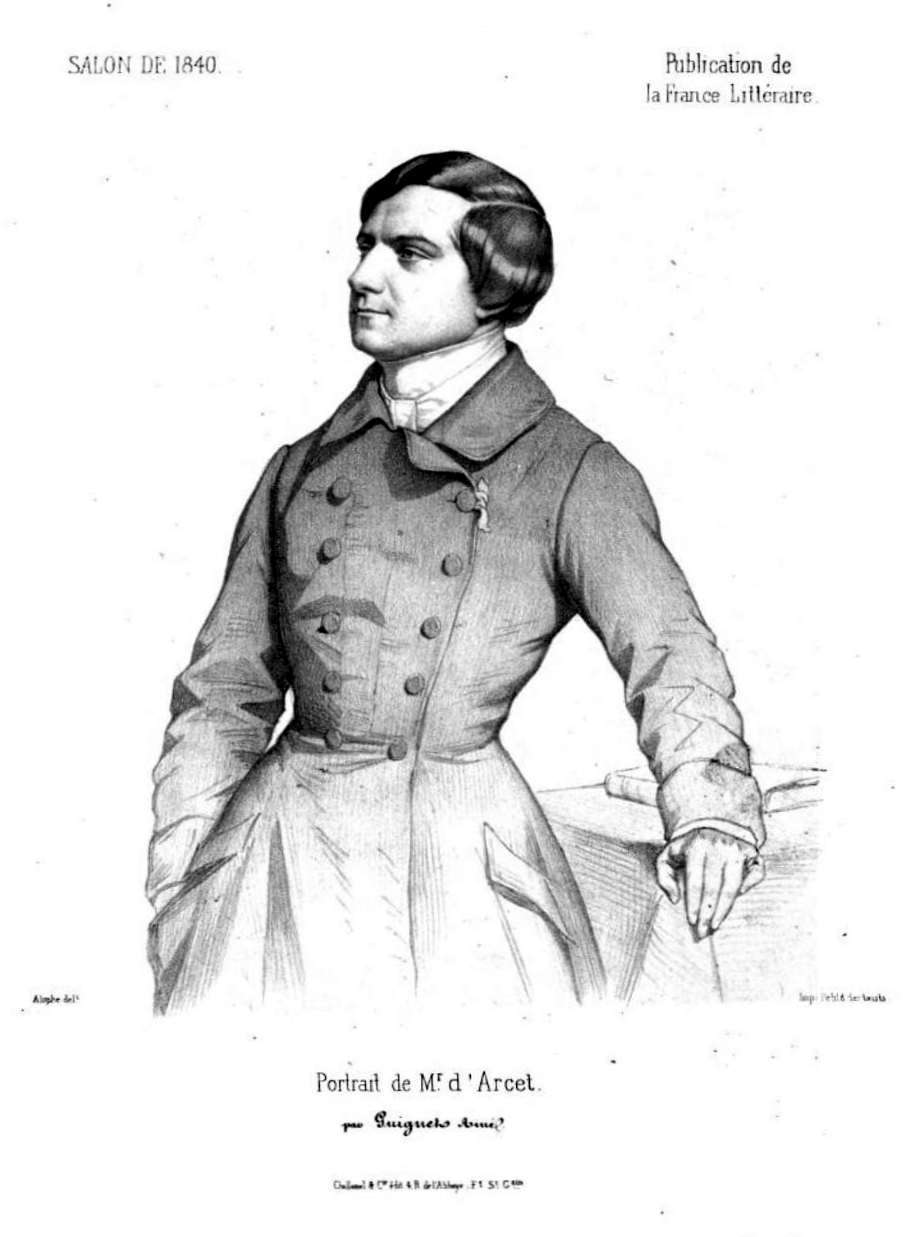
1840 portrait by Jean-Baptiste Guignet

Felix d'Arcet (1814 – 1847) was a French chemist. He was a son of the chemist Jean Pierre Joseph d'Arcet (1777–1844) who was known for his work in bone soups as nutritional supplements.

D'Arcet was the son of Jean Pierre Joseph and Claire Choron. He had two sisters of whom Louise (1814–1885) married sculptor James Pradier and became the inspiration for Gustave Flaubert's character Emma in Madame Bovary. Felix d'Arcet received a degree in 1828 and became a chemist for the Egypt expedition (1828–29) under Etienne Pariset. He studied the plague in Egypt. He also studied the use of alum for removing sediment from the water of the Nile. At the age of 23 he received a Légion d'honneur. He studied aresenovinic acid and succinic acid. He studied medicine and received a medical license from the medical faculty of Paris in 1842 with a dissertation on septicemia. He also wrote a dissertation on eye infections. In 1845 he went to Brazil as part of the French Academy of Sciences to develop chemical industry and teaching there. He was working on the production of sulphuric acid when he was killed in a fire in Rio de Janeiro in a lab accident involving an associate who was working with a gas lamp.

His publications include:

- (1835) Note sur l’acide arseno-vinique. Comptes Rendus I: 441.
- (1835) Sur l’acide succinique. Ann Mines VII: 385–386.
- (1836) Ueber Arsenikweinsäure. Ann Pharm 19: 202–203.
- (1842) Recherches sur les absces multiples. These de Doctoraten Medecine, Paris.
- (1844) Recherches sur les ophtalmies purulentes. Rignaud, Paris
