= Château de Candale =

French castle

Coordinates: 43°41′01″N 0°39′46″W

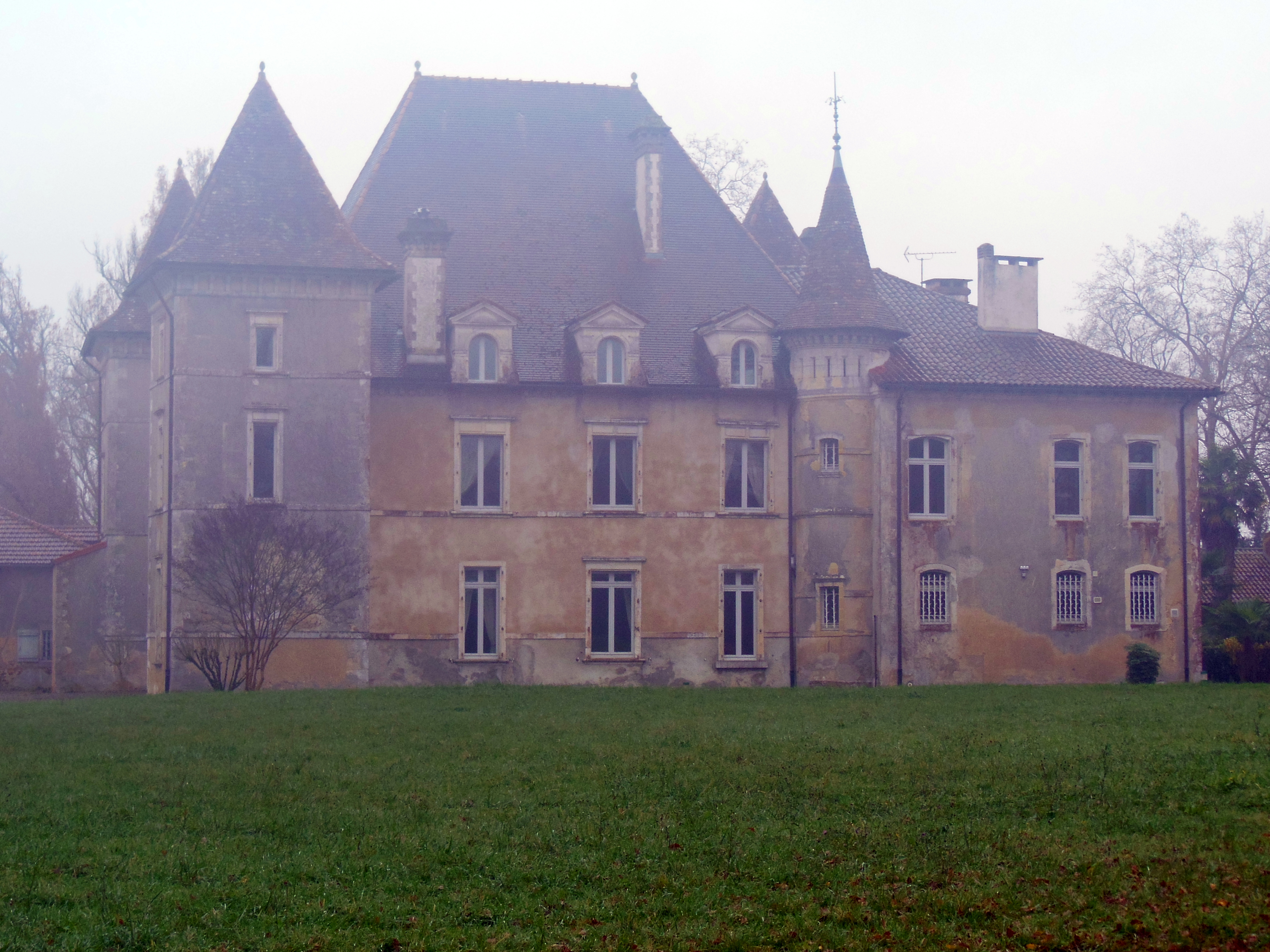
Château de Candale, 2014

Château de Candale is a château in the commune of Doazit in Landes département, Nouvelle-Aquitaine, France.

The château was built at the end of the 16th century by the lords of Foix-Candale, who made themselves masters of the barony of Doazit from the 15th century.
