= Hitlerszalonna =

World War II provision eaten by Hungarians

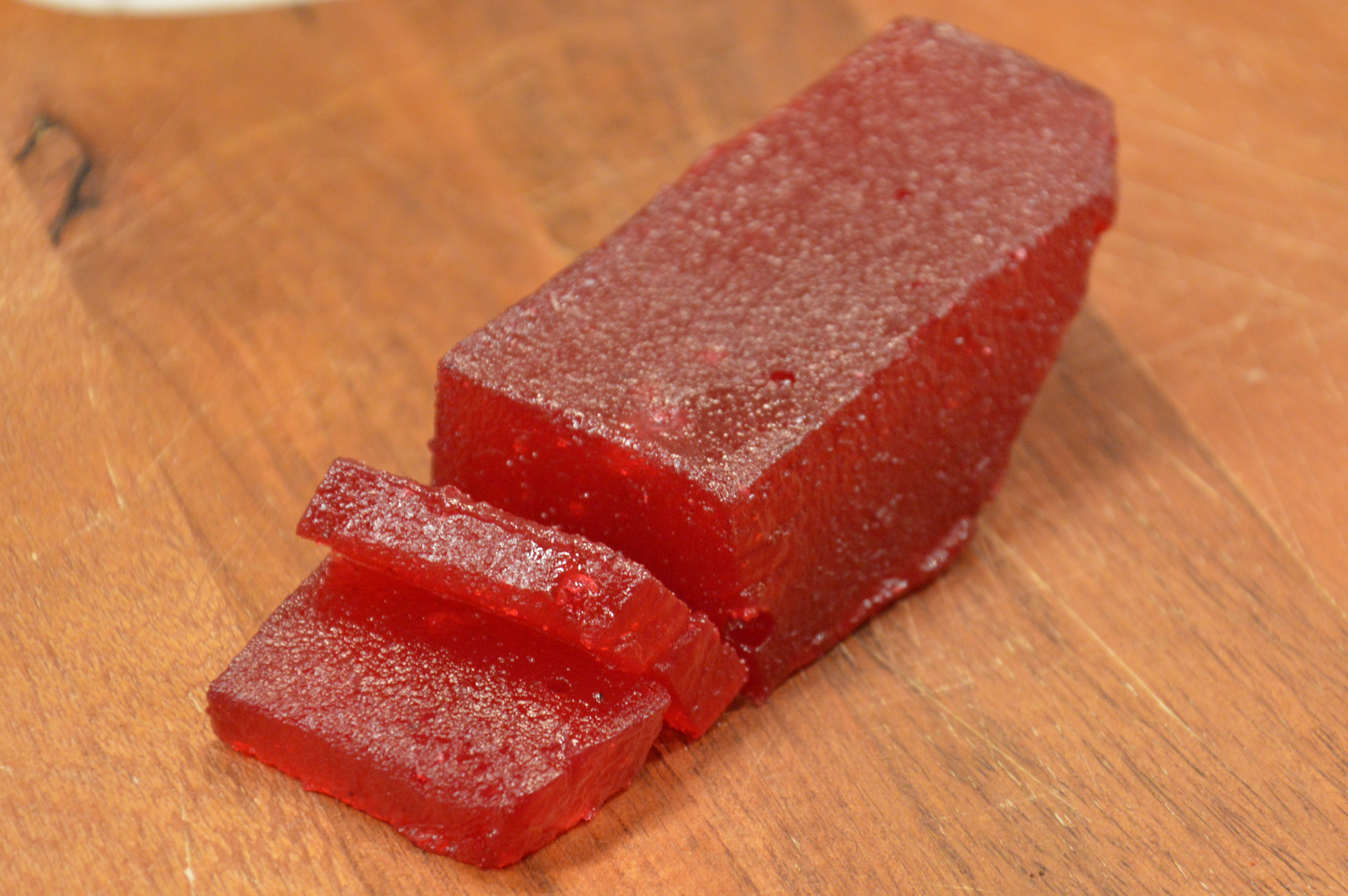
A slab of modern sütésálló lekvár

Hitlerszalonna (Hungarian for 'Hitler bacon'), known in the modern day as sütésálló lekvár ('ovenproof jam'), is a dense fruit jam that originated in the Kingdom of Hungary during World War II. It was sold in brick shaped blocks held in a piece of paper, and was sliced like szalonna. Soldiers kept it in a case and it could be cooked with other foods. In the modern day, sütésálló lekvár is often sold in small portion cups. The term itself is considered slang and defined as something like 'tough fruit'.

== Etymology ==
One possible source of this name derives from military rations given to soldiers of the Royal Hungarian Army. In armed conflicts under Austria-Hungary, Hungarian soldiers received normal bacon as part of their rations; the bacon was nicknamed "Kaiser-bacon", in reference to the Kaiser of Austria.

During World War II, Hungarian soldiers received rations from Nazi Germany, but often received fruit jam instead of bacon. The soldiers continued to refer to this as the emperor's bacon, and the "emperor" was Führer Adolf Hitler.

This expression has also appeared in a printed book. When describing the Royal Hungarian Army's logistical situation at the Don River and before the Battle of Stalingrad, the account (as translated below into English) states that:

The food supply of the Hungarian soldiers was not adequate ... Not only the Hungarian armies but also German troops suffered from the lack of proper food; but for the Hungarian soldiers there was an additional drawback, that the food was German, and these German foods (like pudding, anchovy paste, cheese in a tube) were uncommon and not popular among the Hungarians. Only one German food was accepted by the soldiers and was even brought back to Hungary and became a normal product in those days, and that was the "Hitler bacon" which is a flavoured jam made from pumpkin.

== See also ==
- Turkish delight, a similar pectin based food
- Hungarian cuisine
- Hungary in World War II
- List of plum dishes
- Quince cheese
