= Jean Pierre Joseph d'Arcet =

French chemist

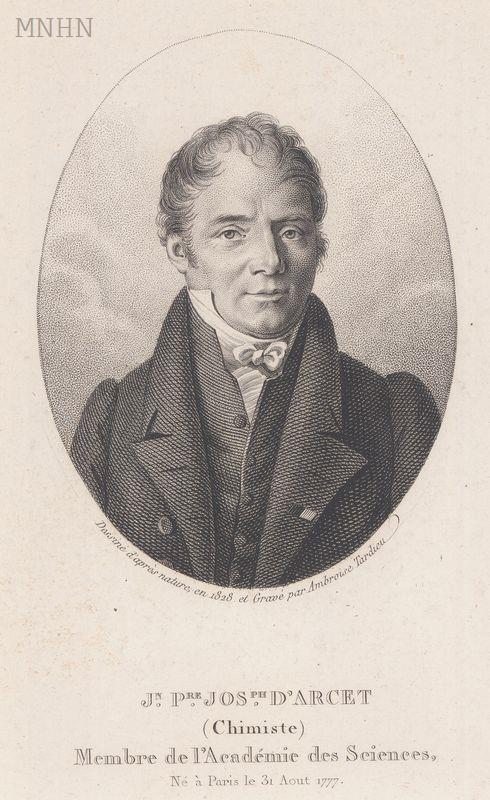

Jean Pierre Joseph d'Arcet (31 August 1777 – 2 August 1844) was a French chemist. He was a son of the chemist Jean Darcet. He was among the first to efficiently extract gelatin from bones. He suggested its use as a nutritional supplement for the poor. His son Felix (1807–1846) also became a chemist.

== Life and work ==
D'Arcet was born in Paris, the son of Jean Darcet. Educated initially at the Collège de France where his father worked, he then became a student of Louis-Nicolas Vauquelin. He worked in the mint and was involved in metallurgical experiments. He also began to conduct private research and found a way to efficiently extract gelatin from bones. He received a patent in 1814 for the manufacture of bone glue and broth. His gelatine supplement was introduced as a diet in the Saint-Antoine Hospital by the Duke of La Rouchefoucald-Liancourt. It was also introduced for army troops. By 1831, several physicians opposed the merits of food gelatin. He also worked on bronze alloy compositions. He served as master of the Paris mint until his death.

D'Arcet married Claire Choron and they had three children, Félix, Louise and Pauline. Felix became a chemist and Louise (1814–1885) married the sculptor James Pradier (1792–1852) and was a model for Gustave Flaubert's character Emma in Madame Bovary.
