= Collodion bag =

A collodion bag is a membrane used to filter or concentrate substances, often proteins, using pressure. It usually takes the form of a small finger shaped receptacle hooked up to a positive pressure pump. The bag has a characteristic that allows small particles, like water or unbound ions, to flow out while retaining larger particles in the bag.
