= Doazit =

- Commune
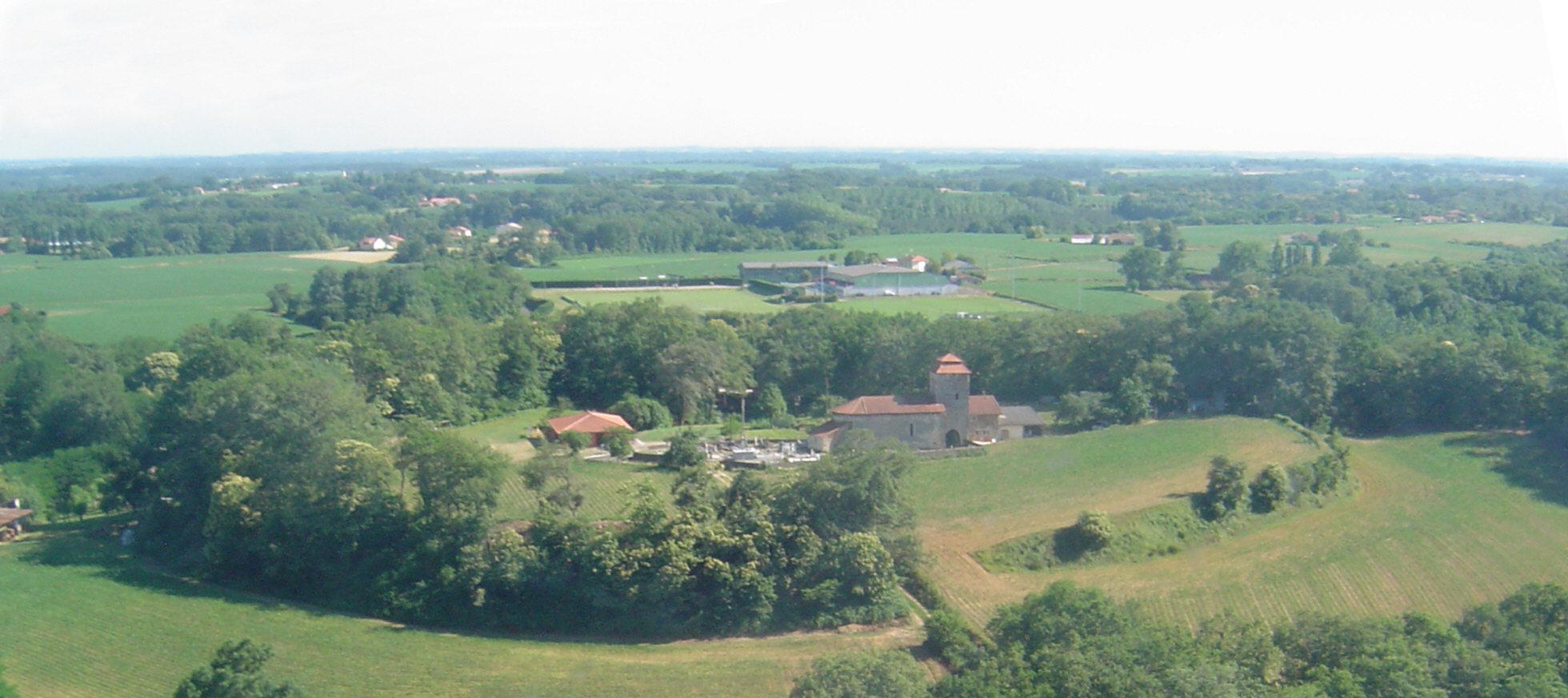
- Camp du Mus

- Coat of arms
- Location of Doazit
- Location within France Location within Nouvelle-Aquitaine
- Coordinates: 43°41′29″N 0°38′42″W
- Country: France
- Region: Nouvelle-Aquitaine
- Department: Landes
- Arrondissement: Dax
- Canton: Coteau de Chalosse

Government
  - Mayor (2024–2026): Frédéric Darget
- Area^{1}: 22.16 km^{2} (8.56 sq mi)
- Elevation: 112 m (367 ft)
- Highest elevation: 127 m (417 ft)
- Lowest elevation: 57 m (187 ft)
- Population (2023): 839
  - Density: 37.9/km^{2} (98.1/sq mi)
- Time zone: UTC+01:00 (CET)
  - Summer (DST): UTC+02:00 (CEST)
- INSEE/Postal code: 40089 /40700
- ^{1} French Land Register data, which excludes lakes, ponds, glaciers > 1 km^{2} (0.386 sq mi or 247 acres) and river estuaries.

Doazit (French pronunciation: [dɔazi]; Occitan: Doasit) is a commune in the Landes department in Nouvelle-Aquitaine in southwestern France.

== Population ==
Historical population
Year	Pop.	±% p.a.
1968	1,032	—
1975	901	−1.92%
1982	865	−0.58%
1990	858	−0.10%
1999	884	+0.33%
2007	931	+0.65%
2012	905	−0.56%
2017	858	−1.06%
2023	839	−0.37%
Source: INSEE

== See also ==
- Château de Candale
- Communes of the Landes department
