= Invadopodia =

Structure on the membranes of cancer cells

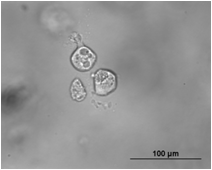
A microscope picture of a cell's invadopodium.

In oncology, invadopodia are actin-rich protrusions of the plasma membrane that are associated with degradation of the extracellular matrix (ECM) in cancer invasiveness and metastasis. Very similar to podosomes, invadopodia are found in invasive cancer cells and are important for their ability to invade through the extracellular matrix, especially in cancer cell extravasation. Invadopodia are generally visualized by the holes they create in ECM (fibronectin, collagen etc.)-coated plates, in combination with immunohistochemistry for the invadopodia localizing proteins such as cortactin, actin, Tks5 etc. Invadopodia can also be used as a marker to quantify the invasiveness of cancer cell lines in vitro using a hyaluronic acid hydrogel assay.

== History and controversy ==
In the early 1980s, researchers noticed protrusions coming from the ventral membrane of cultured chicken embryo fibroblasts that had been transformed by the Rous Sarcoma Virus and that they were at the sites of cell-to-extracellular matrix (ECM) adhesion. They termed these structures podosomes, or cellular feet, but it was later noticed that degradation of the ECM was occurring at these sites and the name invadopodia was coined to highlight the invasive nature of these protrusions. Since then, researchers have often used the two names interchangeably, but it is generally accepted that podosomes are the structures involved in normal biological processes (as when immune cells must cross tissue barriers or in bone remodeling) and invadopodia are the structures in invading cancer cells. However, there remains controversy around this nomenclature, with some scientists arguing that the two are different enough to be considered distinct structures while others argue that invadopodia are simply disregulated podosomes and cancer cells don't simply "invent" new mechanisms. Due to this confusion and the high similarity between the two structures, many have begun to group the two under the collective term invadosomes.

== Structure and formation ==
Invadopodia have an actin core, which is surrounded by a ring structure enriched in actin-binding proteins, adhesion molecules, integrins, and scaffold proteins. With a width of 0.5- 2.0 um and a length greater than 2 um, invadopodia are generally longer than podosomes. Lasting up to several hours, invadopedia are fairly stable and can also last much longer than podosomes. Invadopodia also penetrate deep into the ECM, while podosomes generally extend upward into the cytoplasm and do not cause as much ECM degradation.

Invadopodia formation is a complex process that involves multiple signaling pathways and can be described as having three steps: initiation, stabilization, and maturation. Initiation of invadopodia involves the formation of buds in the plasma membrane and is initiated by growth factors like epidermal growth factor (EGF), transforming growth factor beta (TGFB) or platelet-derived growth factor (PDGF), which act through phosphoinositide 3-kinase (PI3K) to activate Src family kinases. These kinases have key roles in the formation of invadopodia and when activated, phosphorylate multiple proteins involved in invadopodia formation including Tks5, synaptjanin-2, and the Abl-family kinase Arg4. The phosphorylation of these proteins leads to the recruitment of the Neural Wiskott-Aldrich syndrome protein (N-Wasp) to invadopodia, which requires Arp2/3, to activate actin polymerization and thus invadopodia elongation. A key step during invadopodia formation is the stabilization of invadopodia, which involves the interaction of PX domain of Tks5 (a scaffold protein) with phospholipid, PI(3,4)P_{2} to anchor the invadopodia core to the plasma membrane. Maturation of invadopodia requires sustained actin polymerization and there are several regulators of actin polymerization involved in this step, including cofilin, fascin, Arg kinase, and mDia2. Invadopodia are considered mature when matrix metalloproteases (MMPs), specifically MMP2, 9, and 14, are recruited to the invadopodium to be released into the extracellular matrix.

== Role in cancer metastasis ==
Metastasis is the leading cause of mortality in cancer patients; it relies on the ability of cancer cells to degrade the surrounding extracellular matrix and invade other tissues. The mechanisms of this process are still not completely understood, and because of the invasive properties of invadopodia, they have been investigated in this context. Indeed, invadopodia have been implicated in many cancers and cancer cells. Increased invasiveness of cancer cells correlates with invadopodia presence, and cancer cells have been observed to project them into the endothelium of blood vessels during extravasation, an important step in metastasis. Invadopodia have also been shown to correlate with a poorer prognosis in breast cancer patients.

Tks5, a protein specific for invadopodia, has been implicated in cancer invasiveness. Increased levels of tks5 have been detected in prostate cancer and overexpression of Tks5 was sufficient to induce invadopodia formation and degradation of the extracellular matrix in an Src-dependent manner. Increased Tks5 expression has been shown to correlate with poor patient prognosis in gliomas. In a mouse model of lung adenocarcinoma, invasive tumors were shown to have an increased expression of a long isoform of tks5 while non-metastatic tumors had a short isoform. It was also shown that overexpression of the long isoform of tks5 was sufficient to cause non-metastatic tumors to become invasive.

== Therapeutic relevance ==
Due to the invasive nature of invadopodia in cancer cells, research has focused on targeting invadopodia as a potential therapeutic target to inhibit metastasis. Inhibiting invadopodia formation by targeting Src kinase with Saracatinib in a chicken model system showed a decreased incidence of invadopodia and decreased cancer extravasation. In mice, inhibiting invadopodia formation directly, through RNAi against tks4 or tks5, significantly reduced cancer extravasation. Screening for drug activators and inhibitors of invadopodia revealed that Cdc5 can be a target for inhibiting invadopodia formation and also that, paradoxically, paclitaxel, a drug commonly used to treat cancer, induces invadopodia formation. These results show potential for invadopodia as a therapeutic target, and research in this field continues.

== See also ==
- Podosomes
