= Podosome =

Conical protrusions of certain animal cell membranes

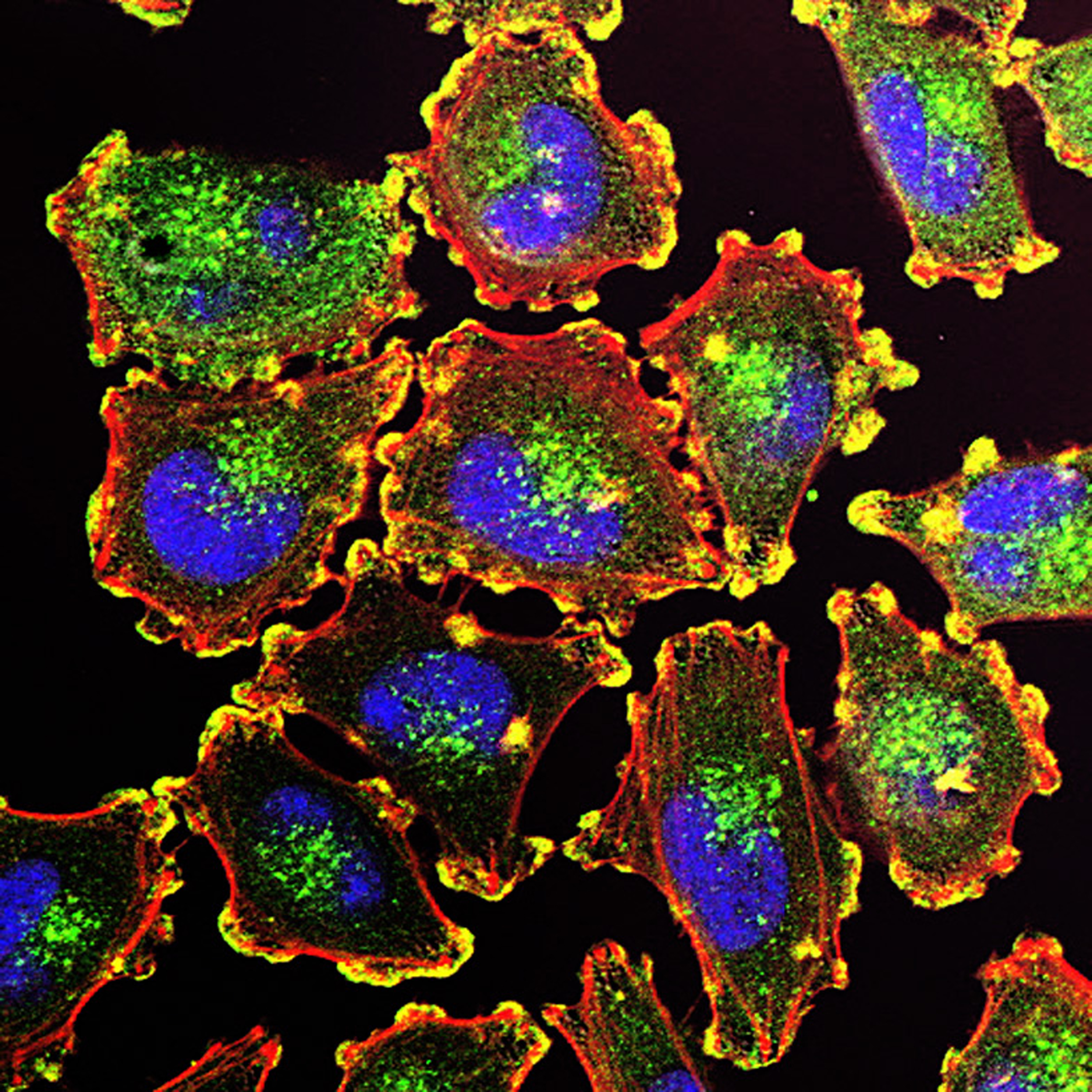
- Podosomes (yellow) in melanoma cells, along with cell nuclei (blue), actin (red), and an actin regulator (green).

Details

Identifiers
- Latin: podosoma
- MeSH: D000069261
- TH: H1.00.01.1.02034

Podosomes are conical, actin-rich structures formed on the ventral plasma membrane of animal cells. Their size ranges from approximately 0.5 μm to 2.0 μm in diameter. While usually situated on the periphery of the cellular membrane, these unique structures display a polarized pattern of distribution in migrating cells, situating at the front border between the lamellipodium and lamellum. Their primary purpose is connected to cellular motility and invasion; therefore, they serve as both sites of attachment and degradation along the extracellular matrix. Many different specialized cells exhibit these dynamic structures such as invadopodia (invasive cancer cells), osteoclasts, vascular smooth muscle cells, endothelial cells, and certain immune cells such as macrophages and dendritic cells.

== Characteristics ==
A podosome consists of a core rich in actin surrounded by adhesion and scaffolding proteins. The actin filaments within these structures are highly regulated by many actin nucleators, polymerization activators, actin binding and crosslinking proteins, kinases, small GTPases, and scaffold proteins; therefore, total actin turnover occurs within seconds. To distinguish podosomes from others types of cellular adhesions, the protein Tks5 and WASP (Wiskott–Aldrich syndrome protein) are used as markers alongside actin, cortactin and the Arp2/3 complex to localize and isolate these protrusions because Tks5 and WASP are unique to the podosome when compared with other actin-based cellular structures.

In their outward structure, the podosomes demonstrate two distinct features: an actin core and a ring complex. Within the core, coordinators of actin nucleation are found. Specifically, the Arp2/3 complex and WASP when close to the plasma membrane or cortactin when further away comprise this group of proteins. Emanating radially from the dense core of actin are actin filaments reaching to the plasma membrane and between neighboring podosomes.

In the ring complex, integrins and integrin-associated proteins serve to connect the cytoskeleton to cell surface integrins forming the outward protrusion. Initial research suggested that the superstructure of podosomes were cylindrical, but new advances in bioimaging techniques have altered that perception and show the ring complex to display a polygonal form. These finding were made possible through the application of Bayesian blinking and bleaching analytics to data gained from standard widefield microscopy using cells that expressed fluorescently tagged proteins specific to the podosome ring complex.

Typically, the podosome size falls between 0.5 um and 2.0 um in diameter and depth. The lifetime of the structure is only minutes in duration, much shorter than observed in invadopodia.

== Function ==
Podosomes are thought to be intimately connected to cellular motility within tissue microenvironments through coordinating degradation of the extracellular matrix with cellular movement. The migration of cells is essential to proper embryonic development and, in maturity, to wound healing and the inflammatory response. Examples of these motile cell behaviors include: transendothelial migration of dendritic cells, migration of aortic endothelial cells for arterial vessel remodeling, and tissue infiltration by macrophages. Aberrations in cell migration lie beneath pathologies involving development, vasculature, and immunity. Consequently, podosomes are present in cell types associated with tissue remodeling and the immune system.

Patients who suffer from Wiskott–Aldrich syndrome demonstrate, through their immune cells, continued evidence of the role podosomes fulfill in cell motility. These patients do not possess fully formed WASP that has been shown to localize in podosomes and to be integral to their formation from previous studies. The dendritic cells and macrophages of these patients’ immune systems do not manifest podosome formations and demonstrate defects in cellular movement within tissue microenvironments. Some researchers suspect that podosomes may be implicated in the migration of neural crest cells. Patients who exhibit Frank–ter Haar syndrome are known to be mutant for the podosome specific protein Tks4 and demonstrate defects in neural crest cell migration.

Adding to the known functionalities of podosomes, research suggests that these dynamic structures also exhibit mechanosensory attributes. Initial formation of podosomes seems to be influenced by the structure and composition of the underlying substratum including the presence and distribution of specific ligands. Various integrin receptors monitor the mechanical properties of the cellular microenvironment and can influence and initiate formation of a podosome. Once fully formed, the integrity of the matrix substratum dictates the lifespan of the podosome with increased stiffness leading to longer endurance and closer spacing between podosome sites.

Some studies indicates also a putative role for podosomes even in the regulation of bone marrow stem cell's function. Podosomes have been shown to be widely present in vitro on mesodermal progenitor cells (MPCs), cell capable of differentiating into mesenchymal stromal cells. It has been proposed that podosomes are important in the mobilisation of MPCs in the event of physiological need.

=== Role in osteoclasts ===
Osteoclasts are large, multinucleated bone cells that conduct the process of bone resorption. In this remodeling process, podosomes play an integral role. During the maturation of osteoclast precursors, groups of podosomes form higher ordered ring structures which ultimately coalesce into a band about the cell periphery. The resulting arrangement of podosomes is highly interconnected through a dense, radial network of actin filaments that extend between and onto neighboring podosomes.

Accumulation of F-actin, vinculin, paxillin, and α-actin within the podosomes of the coalescent band signals the development of a fully matured osteoclast. Upon initiation of bone resorption, the band of podosomes disassembles leaving behind a mesh primarily composed of F-actin which functions as the ‘sealing zone.’ This sealing zone becomes the site of osteoclast attachment to the bone matrix. Inhibition of bone resorption through drug intervention results in the lack of the podosome band during early osteoclast differentiation and ultimate absence of a sealing zone.

== History ==
In the early 1980s, chicken embryo fibroblasts were transformed using the Rous sarcoma virus (RSV) containing the oncogene v-src. This transformation elicited the relocalization of vinculin and α-actin in the cytoskeleton from focal adhesions forming circular clusters. Later in 1985, it was shown using the same cells that these protein clusters were localized to protrusions in the ventral plasma membrane, were substratum adhesion sites; therefore, these structures were termed podosomes indicating their foot-like character in cells. In 1989, it was demonstrated that these podosomes played a role in matrix degradation. To reflect this newly discovered destructive nature the name invadopodia was given to these dynamic structures.

Because both terms invadopodia and podosomes were initially used to reference the identical structures in identical cell lines, there exists confusion about the nomenclature. Typically, when these structures are found in normal cells, they are referred to as podosomes, and when in cancer cells, invadopodia.
