= Laurdan =

Names
- Preferred IUPAC name 1-[6-(Dimethylamino)naphthalen-2-yl]dodecan-1-one
- Other names Laurdan

Identifiers
CAS Number	74515-25-6
3D model (JSmol)	Interactive image
ChemSpider	94733
PubChem CID	104983
UNII	Y97FBL93VW
CompTox Dashboard (EPA)	DTXSID80225517
- InChI: InChI=1S/C24H35NO/c1-4-5-6-7-8-9-10-11-12-13-24(26)22-15-14-21-19-23(25(2)3)17-16-20(21)18-22/h14-19H,4-13H2,1-3H3 Key: JHDGGIDITFLRJY-UHFFFAOYSA-N
- SMILES: CCCCCCCCCCCC(=O)c1ccc2cc(ccc2c1)N(C)C

Properties
Chemical formula	C_{24}H_{35}NO
Molar mass	353.55
Appearance	Colourless solid
Melting point	88 °C (190 °F; 361 K) (lit.)
Solubility in water	DMF: soluble; acetonitrile: soluble, methanol: soluble
- Except where otherwise noted, data are given for materials in their standard state (at 25 °C [77 °F], 100 kPa). Infobox references

Laurdan is an organic compound which is used as a fluorescent dye when applied to fluorescence microscopy. It is used to investigate membrane qualities of the phospholipid bilayers of cell membranes. One of its most important characteristics is its sensitivity to membrane phase transitions as well as other alterations to membrane fluidity such as the penetration of water.

== History ==
Laurdan was first synthesized in 1979 by the Argentinian scientist Gregorio Weber, who started biomolecular fluorescence spectroscopy. His thesis, "Fluorescence of Riboflavin, Diasphorase and Related Substances", was the starting point for the application of fluorescence spectroscopy to biomolecules.

Laurdan was designed as a substitute for other dyes, such as previously modified lipids that were inadequate to observe the membrane lipid bilayer because of their interaction with other compounds within the membrane lipid bilayer. Laurdan was designed specifically to study dipolar relaxation on cell membranes. Laurdan shows this effect more evidently because of its polar characteristics. Laurdan was first applied to study membrane fluidity of live cells with a 2-Photon fluorescence microscope in 1994 and it was found that the plasma membrane of cells is more rigid than that of the nuclear membrane.

== Chemical and physical properties ==
Laurdan is composed of a chain of lauric fatty acid (hydrophobic) linked to a naphthalene molecule. Because of a partial charge separation between the 2-dimethylamino and the 6-carbonyl residues, the naphthalene moiety has a dipole moment, which increases upon excitation and causes the reorientation of the surrounding solvent dipoles. This causes its fluorescence and explains its importance in electronic microscopy.

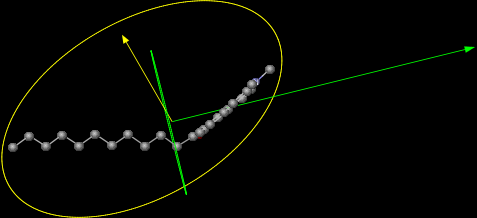
Geometry of Laurdan molecule

The solvent’s reorientation requires energy. This energy requirement decreases the energy state of the excited probe, which is reflected in a continuous red shift in the probe’s emission spectrum. When the probe is in an apolar solvent the shift emission is blue, and a red-shifted emission is observed in polar solvents.

Due to its structure and its fluorescence characteristics, Laurdan is very useful in studies about lipid bilayer dynamics, more particularly about cell's plasmatic membrane's dynamics. The hydrophobic tail of the fatty acid allows the solubilization of the dye in the lipid bilayer, while the naphthalene moiety of the molecule stays at the level of the glycerol backbones of the membrane’s phospholipids. This means that the fluorescent part of the molecule is located towards the aqueous environment, which makes the reorientation of the solvent dipoles by Laurdan’s emission possible.

When Laurdan is located in the cell membrane its emission maximum is centered at 440 nm in gel-phase, and at 490 nm in liquid-phase. This spectral shift is the result of the dipolar relaxation of Laurdan on the lipidic environment, namely, the reorientation of solvents caused by Laurdan’s excitation. Particularly, due to some water molecules located at the level of the glycerol backbone, where the naphthalene moiety resides which can only be reoriented in the liquid phase.

The geometry of the Laurdan molecule is as follows: the Dreiding energy, which is the energy related to the 3D structure of the molecule using the Dreiding force field, is 71.47 kcal/mol. The volume is 377.73 Å^{3} while the minimal projection area is 53.09 Å^{2}. The minimum z length is 24.09 Å, the maximal projection area is 126.21 Å^{2} and the maximum z length is 10.33 Å.

== Applications of Laurdan ==
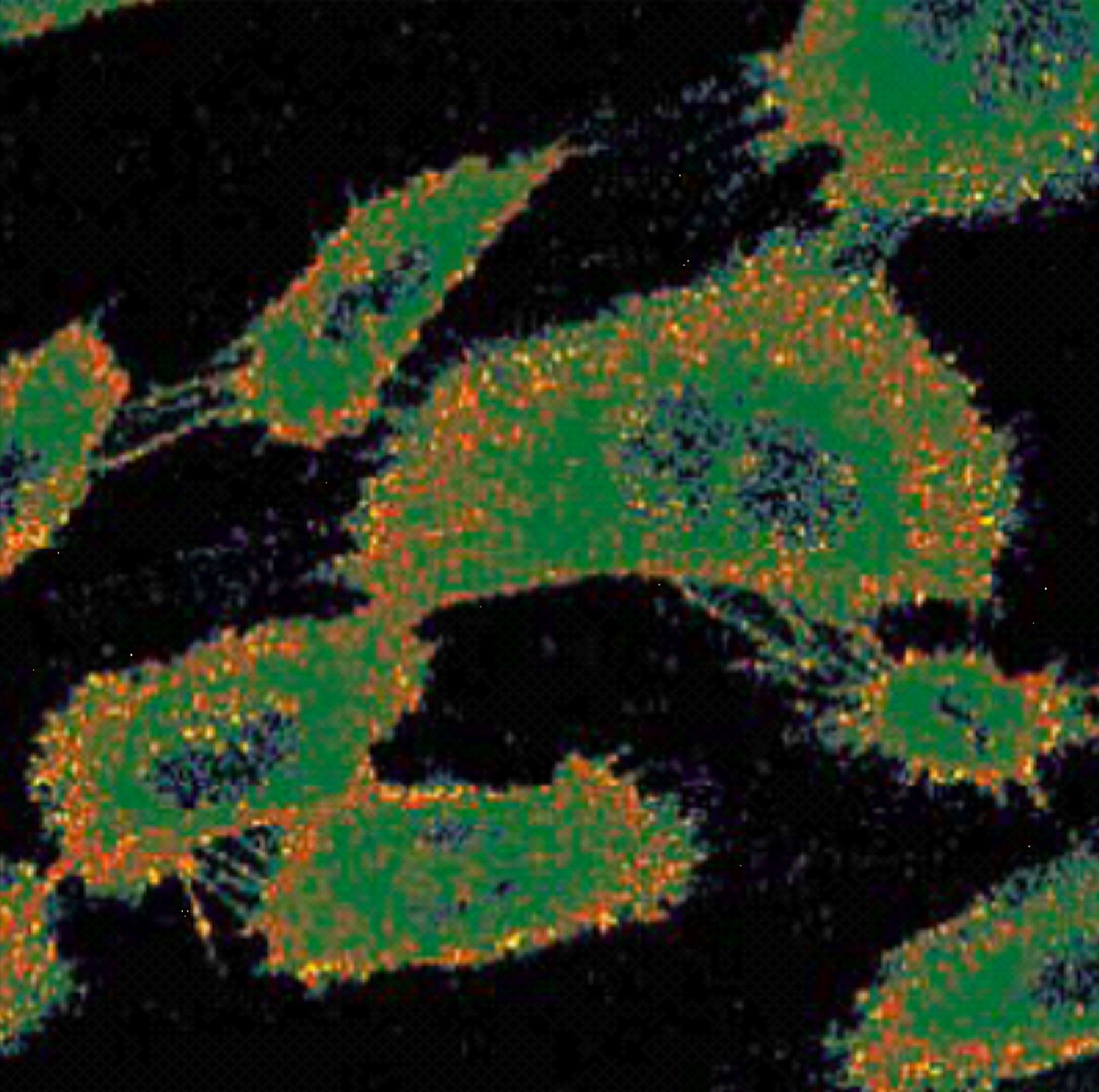
CHO (Chinese Hamster Ovary) cells labelled with Laurdan. Fluidity shown by blues and condensation by yellows

Laurdan has the advantage of being able to be applied to living cells and therefore is able to provide information from complex membranes.

Due to its high sensitivity to the mobility and presence of solvent dipoles, changes in the emission spectrum can be calculated from the generalized polarization. Generalized polarization values vary from 1 (no solvent effect) to -1 (complete exposure to bulk water): Laurdan anisotropy detects changes in plasma membrane fluidity caused by the interaction of determinate surroundings by calculating the generalized polarization and monitoring the reconstitution of lipid microdomains.

The use of Laurdan as a fluorescent marker is to visualize and quantify the insolubility of the plasma membrane, analysing its remodelling activity. Rearrangements of glycosphingolipids, phospholipids, as well as cholesterol explains changes in membrane fluidity.

Some studies developed at the Regional Center for Biotechnology at Haryana (India) have revealed that free hydroxyl groups on specific bile phospholipids increase solvent dipole penetration within the membrane. The number and order of these functional groups are tightly bound.

Studies using mice have been of particular importance in sensing other biomolecules which influence glycerol and acyl chain regions of the plasma membrane. Dietary sources involved in the construction of lipid raft, n-3 PUFA from oil fish as well as polyphenols, affect the molecular and structural shape of the phospholipids in the membrane. As such, this organisation model contributes to distinguishing effects of perturbations on cell membrane order and fluidity.

== See also ==
- Electronic microscope
- Fluorescence
- Cell membrane
- Fluidity
- Lipid Raft
- Gregorio Weber
