= Membrane lipid =

Lipid molecules on cell membrane

The major membrane lipids PtdCho - Phosphatidylcholine; PtdEtn - Phosphatidylethanolamine; PtdIns - Phosphatidylinositol; PtdSer - Phosphatidylserine.

Membrane lipids are a group of compounds (structurally similar to fats and oils) which form the lipid bilayer of the cell membrane. The three major classes of membrane lipids are phospholipids, glycolipids, and cholesterol. Lipids are amphiphilic: they have one end that is soluble in water ('polar') and an ending that is soluble in fat ('nonpolar'). By forming a double layer with the polar ends pointing outwards and the nonpolar ends pointing inwards membrane lipids can form a 'lipid bilayer' which keeps the watery interior of the cell separate from the watery exterior. The arrangements of lipids and various proteins, acting as receptors and channel pores in the membrane, control the entry and exit of other molecules and ions as part of the cell's metabolism. In order to perform physiological functions, membrane proteins are facilitated to rotate and diffuse laterally in two dimensional expanse of lipid bilayer by the presence of a shell of lipids closely attached to protein surface, called annular lipid shell.

== Biological roles ==
The bilayer formed by membrane lipids serves as a containment unit of a living cell. Membrane lipids also form a matrix in which membrane proteins reside. Historically lipids were thought to merely serve a structural role. Functional roles of lipids are in fact many: They serve as regulatory agents in cell growth and adhesion. They participate in the biosynthesis of other biomolecules. They can serve to increase enzymatic activities of enzymes.

Non-bilayer forming lipid like monogalactosyl diglyceride (MGDG) predominates the bulk lipids in thylakoid membranes, which when hydrated alone, forms reverse hexagonal cylindrical phase. However, in combination with other lipids and carotenoids/chlorophylls of thylakoid membranes, they too conform together as lipid bilayers.

== Major classes ==
=== Phospholipids ===
Phospholipids and glycolipids consist of two long, nonpolar (hydrophobic) hydrocarbon chains linked to a hydrophilic head group.

The heads of phospholipids are phosphorylated and they consist of either:

- Glycerol (and hence the name phosphoglycerides given to this group of lipids), or
- Sphingosine (e.g. sphingomyelin and ceramide).

Glycerol dialkyl glycerol tetraether (GDGT) is helping to study ancient environmental factors.

=== Glycolipids ===
The heads of glycolipids (glyco- stands for sugar) contain a sphingosine with one or several sugar units attached to it. The hydrophobic chains belong either to:

- two fatty acids (FA) – in the case of the phosphoglycerides, or
- one FA and the hydrocarbon tail of sphingosine – in the case of sphingomyelin and the glycolipids.

Galactolipids – monogalactosyl diglyceride (MGDG) and digalactosyl diglycreride (DGDG) form the predominant lipids in higher plant chloroplast thylakoid membranes; liposomal structures formed by total lipid extract of thylakoid membranes have been found sensitive to sucrose as it turns bilayers into micellar structures.

=== Fatty acids ===
The fatty acids in phospho- and glycolipids usually contain an even number, typically between 14 and 24, of carbon atoms, with 16- and 18-carbon being the most common. FAs may be saturated or unsaturated, with the configuration of the double bonds nearly always cis. The length and the degree of unsaturation of FAs chains have a profound effect on membranes' fluidity. Plant thylakoid membranes maintain high fluidity, even at relatively cold environmental temperatures, due to the abundance of 18-carbon fatty acyl chains with three double bonds, linolenic acid, as has been revealed by 13-C NMR studies.

=== Phosphoglycerides ===
In phosphoglycerides, the hydroxyl groups at C-1 and C-2 of glycerol are esterified to the carboxyl groups of the FAs. The C-3 hydroxyl group is esterified to phosphoric acid. The resulting compound, called phosphatidate, is the simplest phosphoglycerate. Only small amounts of phosphatidate are present in membranes. However, it is a key intermediate in the biosynthesis of the other phosphoglycerides.

=== Sphingolipids ===
Sphingosine is an amino alcohol that contains a long, unsaturated hydrocarbon chain. In sphingomyelin and glycolipids, the amino group of sphingosine is linked to FAs by an amide bond. In sphingomyelin the primary hydroxyl group of sphingosine is esterified to phosphoryl choline.

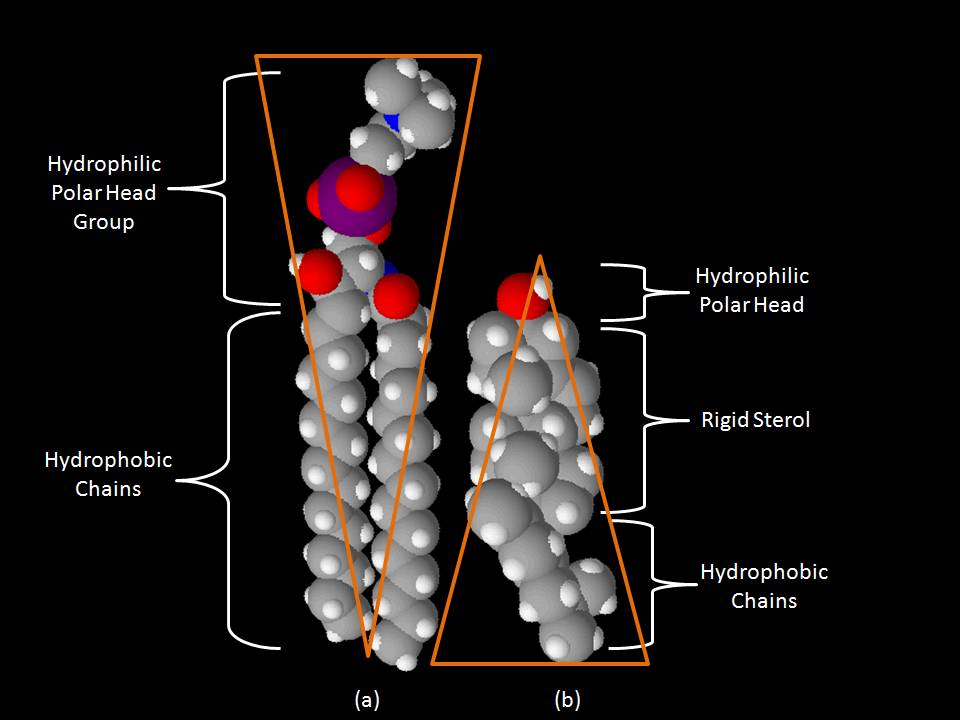
Space-filling models of (a) sphingomyelin and (b) cholesterol.

In glycolipids, the sugar component is attached to this group. The simplest glycolipid is cerebroside, in which there is only one sugar residue, either Glc or Gal. More complex glycolipids, such as gangliosides, contain a branched chain of as many as seven sugar residues.

=== Sterols ===
The best known sterol is cholesterol, which is found in humans. Cholesterol also occurs naturally in other eukaryote cell membranes. Sterols have a hydrophobic four-membered fused ring rigid structure, and a small polar head group.

Cholesterol is bio-synthesised from mevalonate via a squalene cyclisation of terpenoids. Cell membranes require high levels of cholesterol – typically an average of 20% cholesterol in the whole membrane, increasing locally in raft areas up to 50% cholesterol (- % is molecular ratio). It associates preferentially with sphingolipids (see diagram) in cholesterol-rich lipid rafts areas of the membranes in eukaryotic cells. Formation of lipid rafts promotes aggregation of peripheral and transmembrane proteins including docking of SNARE and VAMP proteins. Phytosterols, such as sitosterol and stigmasterol, and hopanoids serve a similar function in plants and prokaryotes.

== See also ==
- Homeoviscous adaptation
- Protein-lipid interaction
