= Membrane fluidity =

Viscosity of the lipid bilayer of a cell membrane

In biology, membrane fluidity refers to the viscosity of the lipid bilayer of a cell membrane or a synthetic lipid membrane. The particular types of lipids present within the membrane can influence how the lipids and other membrane-associated molecules pack together and interact with each other, and thus the fluidity of the membrane. Viscosity of the membrane can in turn affect the rotation and lateral diffusion of proteins and other biomolecules within the membrane, thereby affecting their functions.

Membrane fluidity is strongly affected by the fatty acid substituents of the lipid molecules, particularly by whether the fatty acid chains are saturated or unsaturated. Saturated fatty acids have no double bonds in their hydrocarbon chains, which decreases fluidity. Unsaturated fatty acids have at least one double bond, creating a "kink" in the chain which increases fluidity. While the addition of double bonds raises the lipid's melting temperature, research conducted by Xiaoguang Yang supports the notion that the presence of four or more double bonds is directly correlated with increased membrane fluidity. Membrane fluidity is also notably affected by cholesterol, which in appropriate concentrations can variously make the cell membrane fluid or rigid.

== Factors determining membrane fluidity ==
Membrane fluidity is affected by a number of factors. The main factors are environmental (i.e. temperature) and chemical composition. One way to increase membrane fluidity is to heat up the membrane. Lipids acquire thermal energy when they are heated up; energetic lipids move around more, arranging and rearranging randomly, making the membrane more fluid. At low temperatures, the lipids are laterally ordered and organized in the membrane, and the lipid chains are mostly in the all-trans configuration and pack well together.

The melting temperature ($T_m$) of a membrane is defined as the temperature across which the membrane transitions from a crystal-like to a fluid-like organization, or vice versa. This "phase transition" is not an actual state transition, but the two levels of organization behave very similarly to solid and liquid states of matter.

- $T < T_m$: The membrane is in the crystalline phase, where the level of order in the bilayer is high and the fluidity is low.
- $T > T_m$: The membrane is in the liquid-crystal phase, where the membrane is less ordered and more fluid. At 37 °C, the typical physiological temperature for most human cells, the cell membrane is in this liquid-crystal phase; the presence of cholesterol, however, allows for membrane stabilization and a more compact organization.

The composition of the membrane also affects its fluidity. Membrane phospholipids incorporate fatty acyl chains of varying length and saturation. Lipids with shorter chains are less stiff and less viscous because they are more susceptible to changes in kinetic energy because of their smaller molecular size and because they have less surface area to undergo stabilizing London forces with neighboring hydrophobic chains. Molecules with carbon-carbon double bonds (unsaturated) are more rigid than those that are saturated with hydrogens, as double bonds cannot freely turn. As a result, the presence of fatty acyl chains with unsaturated double bonds makes it harder for the lipids to pack together by putting kinks into the otherwise straightened hydrocarbon chain. While unsaturated lipids may have more rigid individual bonds, membranes made with such lipids are more fluid because the individual lipids cannot pack as tightly as saturated lipids and thus cause the membranes to have lower melting points, such that less thermal energy is required to achieve the same level of fluidity as membranes made with lipids with saturated hydrocarbon chains. Incorporation of particular lipids, such as sphingomyelin, into synthetic lipid membranes is known to stiffen a membrane. Such membranes can be described as "a glass state, i.e., rigid but without crystalline order".

Cholesterol acts as a bidirectional regulator of membrane fluidity because at high temperatures, it stabilizes the membrane and raises its melting point, whereas at low temperatures it intercalates between the phospholipids and prevents them from clustering together and stiffening. Some drugs, e.g. Losartan, are also known to alter membrane viscosity. Another way to change membrane fluidity is to change the pressure. In the laboratory, supported lipid bilayers and monolayers can be made artificially. In such cases, one can still speak of membrane fluidity. These membranes are supported by a flat surface, e.g. the bottom of a box. The fluidity of these membranes can be controlled by the lateral pressure applied, e.g. by the side walls of a box.

== Heterogeneity in membrane physical property ==
Discrete lipid domains with differing composition, and thus membrane fluidity, can coexist in model lipid membranes; this can be observed using fluorescence microscopy. The biological analogue, 'lipid raft', is hypothesized to exist in cell membranes and perform biological functions. Also, a narrow annular lipid shell of membrane lipids in contact with integral membrane proteins have low fluidity compared to bulk lipids in biological membranes, as these lipid molecules stay stuck to surface of the protein macromolecules.

== Measurement methods ==
Membrane fluidity can be measured with electron spin resonance, fluorescence, atomic force microscopy-based force spectroscopy, or deuterium nuclear magnetic resonance spectroscopy. Electron spin resonance measurements involve observing spin probe behaviour in the membrane. Fluorescence experiments involve observing fluorescent probes incorporated into the membrane. Atomic force microscopy experiments can measure fluidity on synthetic or isolated patches of native membranes. Solid state deuterium nuclear magnetic resonance spectroscopy involves observing deuterated lipids. The techniques are complementary in that they operate on different timescales.

Membrane fluidity can be described by two different types of motion: rotational and lateral. In electron spin resonance, rotational correlation time of spin probes is used to characterize how much restriction is imposed on the probe by the membrane. In fluorescence, steady-state anisotropy of the probe can be used, in addition to the rotation correlation time of the fluorescent probe. Fluorescent probes show varying degree of preference for being in an environment of restricted motion. In heterogeneous membranes, some probes will only be found in regions of higher membrane fluidity, while others are only found in regions of lower membrane fluidity. Partitioning preference of probes can also be a gauge of membrane fluidity. In deuterium nuclear magnetic resonance spectroscopy, the average carbon-deuterium bond orientation of the deuterated lipid gives rise to specific spectroscopic features. All three of techniques can give some measure of the time-averaged orientation of the relevant (probe) molecule, which is indicative of the rotational dynamics of the molecule.

Lateral motion of molecules within the membrane can be measured by a number of fluorescence techniques: fluorescence recovery after photobleaching involves photobleaching a uniformly labelled membrane with an intense laser beam and measuring how long it takes for fluorescent probes to diffuse back into the photobleached spot. Fluorescence correlation spectroscopy monitors the fluctuations in fluorescence intensity measured from a small number of probes in a small space. These fluctuations are affected by the mode of lateral diffusion of the probe. Single particle tracking involves following the trajectory of fluorescent molecules or gold particles attached to a biomolecule and applying statistical analysis to extract information about the lateral diffusion of the tracked particle.

== Phospholipid-deficient bio-membranes ==
A study of central linewidths of electron spin resonance spectra of thylakoid membranes and aqueous dispersions of their total extracted lipids, labeled with stearic acid spin label (having spin or doxyl moiety at 5,7,9,12,13,14 and 16th carbons, with reference to carbonyl group), reveals a fluidity gradient. Decreasing linewidth from 5th to 16th carbons represents increasing degree of motional freedom (fluidity gradient) from headgroup-side to methyl terminal in both native membranes and their aqueous lipid extract (a multilamellar liposomal structure, typical of lipid bilayer organization). This pattern points at similarity of lipid bilayer organization in both native membranes and liposomes. This observation is critical, as thylakoid membranes comprising largely galactolipids, contain only 10% phospholipid, unlike other biological membranes consisting largely of phospholipids. Proteins in chloroplast thylakoid membranes, apparently, restrict lipid fatty acyl chain segmental mobility from 9th to 16th carbons vis a vis their liposomal counterparts. Surprisingly, liposomal fatty acyl chains are more restricted at 5th and 7th carbon positions as compared at these positions in thylakoid membranes. This is explainable as due to motional restricting effect at these positions, because of steric hindrance by large chlorophyll headgroups, specially so, in liposomes. However, in native thylakoid membranes, chlorophylls are mainly complexed with proteins as light-harvesting complexes and may not largely be free to restrain lipid fluidity, as such.

=== Diffusion coefficients ===
Diffusion coefficients of fluorescent lipid analogues are about 10^{−8}cm^{2}/s in fluid lipid membranes. In gel lipid membranes and natural biomembranes, the diffusion coefficients are about 10^{−11}cm^{2}/s to 10^{−9}cm^{2}/s.

== Charged lipid membranes ==
The melting of charged lipid membranes, such as 1,2-dimyristoyl-sn-glycero-3-phosphoglycerol, can take place over a wide range of temperature. Within this range of temperatures, these membranes become very viscous.

== Biological relevance ==
Microorganisms subjected to thermal stress are known to alter the lipid composition of their cell membrane (see homeoviscous adaptation). This is one way they can adjust the fluidity of their membrane in response to their environment. Membrane fluidity is known to affect the function of biomolecules residing within or associated with the membrane structure. For example, the binding of some peripheral proteins is dependent on membrane fluidity. Lateral diffusion (within the membrane matrix) of membrane-related enzymes can affect reaction rates. Consequently, membrane-dependent functions, such as phagocytosis and cell signalling, can be regulated by the fluidity of the cell-membrane.

== See also ==
- Annular lipid shell
- Homeoviscous adaptation
- Lipid bilayer
- Lipid bilayer phase behavior
- Liposome
- Saffman–Delbrück model
