= Integral membrane protein =

Type of membrane protein that is permanently attached to the biological membrane

E, extracellular space; P, plasma membrane; I, intracellular space

An integral, or intrinsic, membrane protein (IMP) is a type of membrane protein that is permanently attached to the biological membrane. All transmembrane proteins can be classified as IMPs, but not all IMPs are transmembrane proteins. IMPs comprise a significant fraction of the proteins encoded in an organism's genome. Proteins that cross the membrane are surrounded by annular lipids, which are defined as lipids that are in direct contact with a membrane protein. Such proteins can only be separated from the membranes by using detergents, nonpolar solvents, or sometimes denaturing agents.

Proteins that adhere only temporarily to cellular membranes are known as peripheral membrane proteins. These proteins can either associate with integral membrane proteins, or independently insert in the lipid bilayer in several ways.

== Structure ==
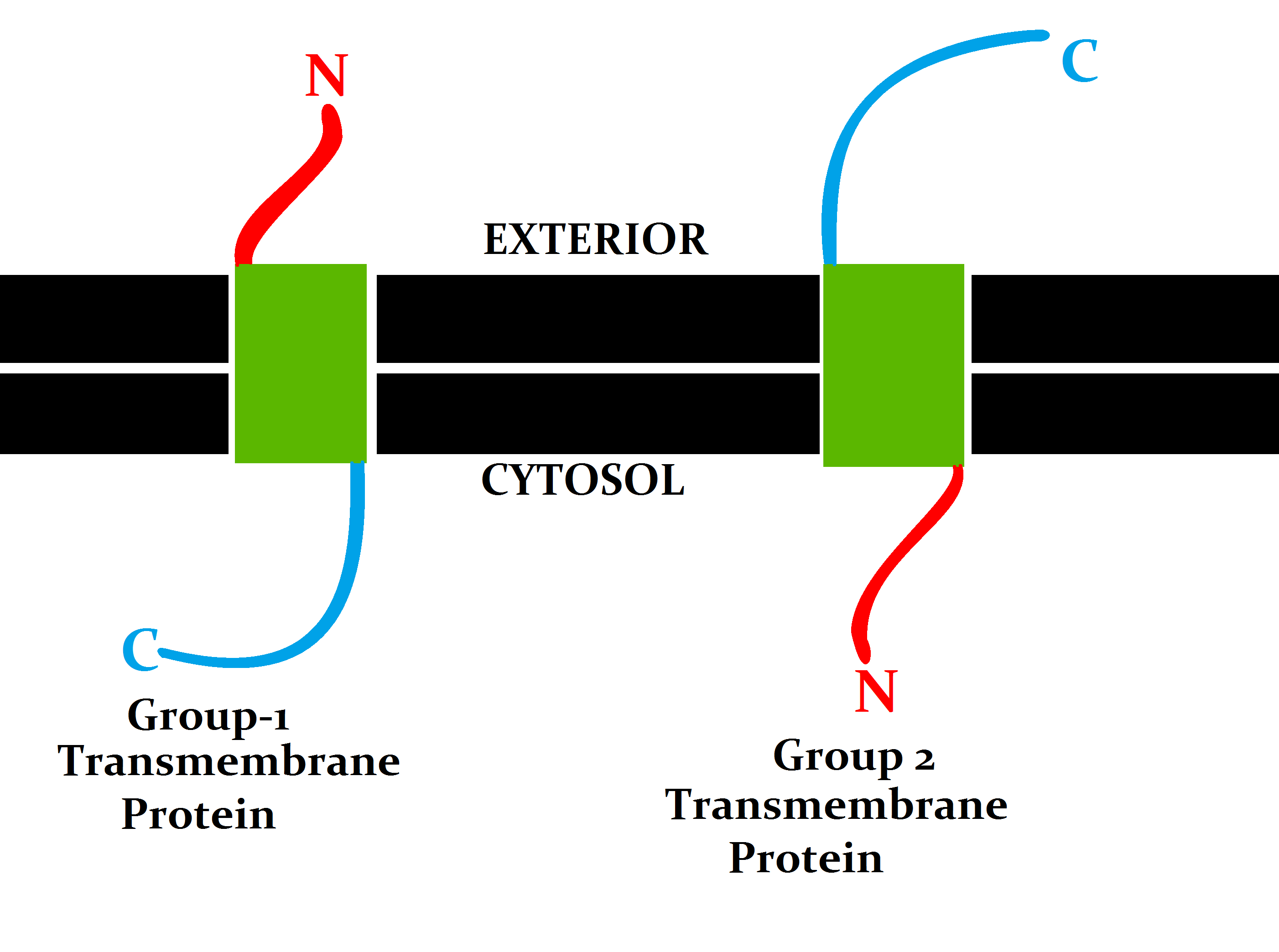
Group I and II transmembrane proteins have opposite orientations. Group I proteins have the N terminus on the far side and C terminus on the cytosolic side. Group II proteins have the C terminus on the far side and N terminus in the cytosol.

Three-dimensional structures of ~160 different integral membrane proteins have been determined at atomic resolution by X-ray crystallography or nuclear magnetic resonance spectroscopy. They are challenging subjects for study owing to the difficulties associated with extraction and crystallization. In addition, structures of many water-soluble protein domains of IMPs are available in the Protein Data Bank. Their membrane-anchoring α-helices have been removed to facilitate the extraction and crystallization. Search integral membrane proteins in the PDB (based on gene ontology classification)

IMPs can be divided into two groups:

1. Integral polytopic proteins (Transmembrane proteins)
2. Integral monotopic proteins

=== Integral polytopic protein ===
The most common type of IMP is the transmembrane protein, which spans the entire biological membrane. Single-pass membrane proteins cross the membrane only once, while multi-pass membrane proteins weave in and out, crossing the membrane several times. Single pass membrane proteins can be categorized as Type I, which are positioned such that their carboxyl-terminus is towards the cytosol, or Type II, which have their amino-terminus towards the cytosol. Type III proteins have multiple transmembrane domains in a single polypeptide, while type IV consists of several different polypeptides assembled together in a channel through the membrane. Type V proteins are anchored to the lipid bilayer through covalently linked lipids. Finally Type VI proteins have both transmembrane domains and lipid anchors.

=== Integral monotopic proteins ===
Schematic representation of the different types of interaction between monotopic membrane proteins and the cell membrane: 1. interaction by an amphipathic α-helix parallel to the membrane plane (in-plane membrane helix) 2. interaction by a hydrophobic loop 3. interaction by a covalently bound membrane lipid (lipidation) 4. electrostatic or ionic interactions with membrane lipids (e.g. through a calcium ion)

Integral monotopic proteins are permanently attached to the cell membrane from one side.

Three-dimensional structures of the following integral monotopic proteins have been determined:

- prostaglandin H2 syntheses 1 and 2 (cyclooxygenases)
- lanosterol synthase and squalene-hopene cyclase
- microsomal prostaglandin E synthase
- carnitine O-palmitoyltransferase 2
- Phosphoglycosyl transferase C

There are also structures of integral monotopic domains of transmembrane proteins:

- monoamine oxidases A and B
- fatty acid amide hydrolase
- mammalian cytochrome P450 oxidases
- corticosteroid 11-beta-dehydrogenases

=== Extraction ===
Many challenges facing the study of integral membrane proteins are attributed to the extraction of those proteins from the phospholipid bilayer. Since integral proteins span the width of the phospholipid bilayer, their extraction involves disrupting the phospholipids surrounding them, without causing any damage that would interrupt the function or structure of the proteins. Several successful methods are available for performing the extraction including the uses of "detergents, low ionic salt (salting out), shearing force, and rapid pressure change".

=== Determination of protein structure ===
The Protein Structure Initiative (PSI), funded by the U.S. National Institute of General Medical Sciences (NIGMS), part of the National Institutes of Health (NIH), has among its aim to determine three-dimensional protein structures and to develop techniques for use in structural biology, including for membrane proteins. Homology modeling can be used to construct an atomic-resolution model of the "target" integral protein from its amino acid sequence and an experimental three-dimensional structure of a related homologous protein. This procedure has been extensively used for ligand-G protein–coupled receptors (GPCR) and their complexes.

== Function ==
IMPs include transporters, linkers, channels, receptors, enzymes, structural membrane-anchoring domains, proteins involved in accumulation and transduction of energy, and proteins responsible for cell adhesion. Classification of transporters can be found in Transporter Classification Database.

As an example of the relationship between the IMP (in this case the bacterial phototrapping pigment, bacteriorhodopsin) and the membrane formed by the phospholipid bilayer is illustrated below. In this case the integral membrane protein spans the phospholipid bilayer seven times. The part of the protein that is embedded in the hydrophobic regions of the bilayer are alpha helical and composed of predominantly hydrophobic amino acids. The C terminal end of the protein is in the cytosol while the N terminal region is in the outside of the cell. A membrane that contains this particular protein is able to function in photosynthesis.

== Examples ==
Examples of integral membrane proteins:

- Insulin receptor
- Some types of cell adhesion proteins or cell adhesion molecules (CAMs) such as integrins, cadherins, NCAMs, or selectins
- Some types of receptor proteins
- Glycophorin
- Rhodopsin
- Band 3
- CD36
- Glucose Permease
- Ion channels and Gates
- Gap junction Proteins
- G protein coupled receptors (e.g., Beta-adrenergic receptor)
- Seipin
- Photosystem I

== See also ==
- Membrane protein
- Transmembrane protein
- Peripheral membrane protein
- Annular lipid shell
- Hydrophilicity plot
- Inner nuclear membrane protein
