= Lipid raft =

Combination in the membranes of cells

Lipid raft organization, region (1) is a standard lipid bilayer, while region (2) is a lipid raft.

Lipid rafts are described as specialized structures, or as dynamic cell membrane microdomains. They are believed to be glycolipoprotein lipid microdomains containing a combination of glycosphingolipids, cholesterol, and protein that is recruited, including receptors. Although initially described in the plasma membrane and Golgi membrane, lipid rafts have also been reported in other endomembranes such as lysosomes. However, it is questionable whether it is appropriate to label any such structures lipid rafts, given that their composition and properties deviate considerably from the original lipid raft theory. The lipid raft theory has a history of being redefined in response to contradictory evidence.

Cholesterol is an intrinsic component of the cell membrane where it maintains the stability and fluidity of the membrane. Cholesterol regulates protein signaling as a major organiser of lipid rafts. Lipid rafts serve as organising centers for assembling signalling molecules, and influence membrane protein trafficking, to regulate different cell processes such as neurotransmission and receptor trafficking.

Lipid rafts are more ordered and tightly packed than the surrounding bilayer, but float freely within the membrane bilayer.

Some researchers propose that lipid rafts are an incidental feature of only incidental physiological significance.

== Properties ==
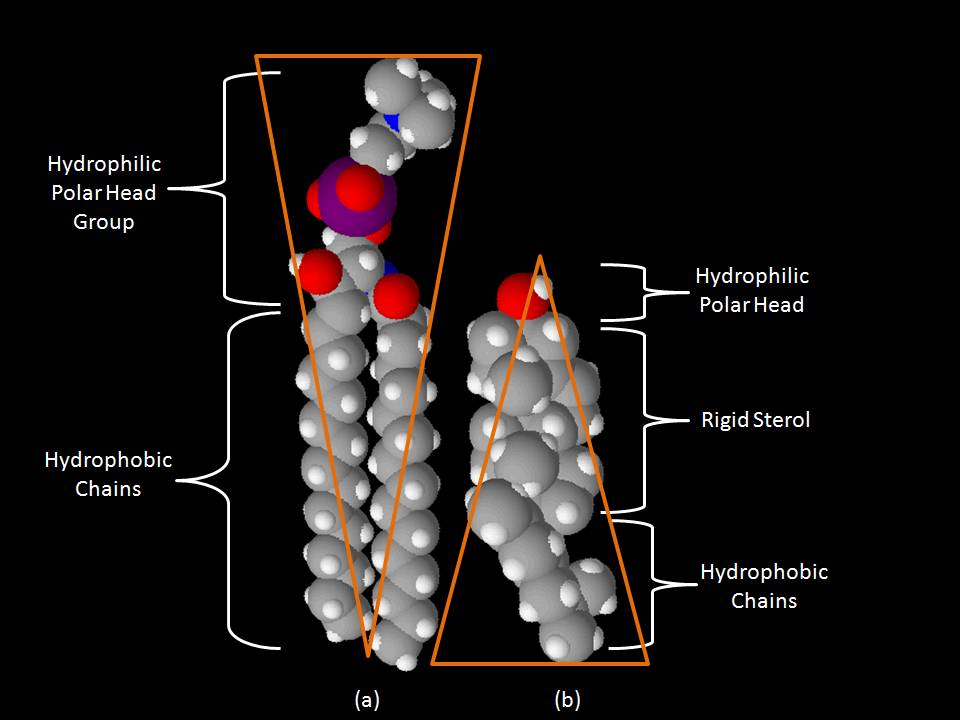
Space-filling models of sphingomyelin (a) and cholesterol (b)

One key difference between lipid rafts and the plasma membranes from which they are derived is lipid composition. Research has shown that lipid rafts contain 3 to 5-fold the amount of cholesterol found in the surrounding bilayer. Also, lipid rafts are enriched in sphingolipids such as sphingomyelin, which is typically elevated by 50% compared to the plasma membrane. To offset the elevated sphingolipid levels, phosphatidylcholine levels are decreased which results in similar choline-containing lipid levels between the rafts and the surrounding plasma membrane. Cholesterol interacts preferentially, although not exclusively, with sphingolipids due to their structure and the saturation of the hydrocarbon chains. Although not all of the phospholipids within the raft are fully saturated, the hydrophobic chains of the lipids contained in the rafts are more saturated and tightly packed than the surrounding bilayer. Cholesterol is the dynamic "glue" that holds the raft together. Due to the rigid nature of the sterol group, cholesterol partitions preferentially into the lipid rafts where acyl chains of the lipids tend to be more rigid and in a less fluid state. One important property of membrane lipids is their amphipathic character. Amphipathic lipids have a polar, hydrophilic head group and a non-polar, hydrophobic region. The figure to the right shows the inverted cone-like shape of sphingomyelin and the cone-like shape of cholesterol based on the area of space occupied by the hydrophobic and hydrophilic regions. Cholesterol can pack in between the lipids in rafts, serving as a molecular spacer and filling any voids between associated sphingolipids.

Rietveld & Simons related lipid rafts in model membranes to the immiscibility of ordered (Lo phase) and disordered (Ld or Lα phase) liquid phases. The cause of this immiscibility is uncertain, but is thought to minimize the free energy between the two phases. Studies have shown there is a difference in thickness of the lipid rafts and the surrounding membrane which results in hydrophobic mismatch at the boundary between the two phases. This phase height mismatch has been shown to increase line tension which may lead to the formation of larger and more circular raft platforms to minimize the energetic cost of maintaining the rafts as a separate phase. Other spontaneous events, such as curvature of the membrane and fusing of small rafts into larger rafts, can also minimize line tension.

By one early definition of lipid rafts, lipid rafts differ from the rest of the plasma membrane. In fact, researchers have hypothesized that the lipid rafts can be extracted from a plasma membrane. The extraction would take advantage of lipid raft resistance to non-ionic detergents, such as Triton X-100 or Brij-98 at low temperatures (e.g., 4 °C). When such a detergent is added to cells, the fluid membrane will dissolve while the lipid rafts may remain intact and could be extracted.

Because of their composition and detergent resistance, lipid rafts are also called detergent-insoluble glycolipid-enriched membrane (GEM) complexes or DIGs or Detergent Resistant Membranes (DRMs). However the validity of the detergent resistance methodology of membranes has recently been called into question due to ambiguities in the lipids and proteins recovered and the observation that they can also cause solid areas to form where there were none previously.

== Function ==
Mediation of substrate presentation. Lipid rafts localize palmitoylated proteins away from the disordered region of the plasma membrane. Disruption of palmitate mediated localization then allows for exposure of a protein to its binding partner or substrate in the disordered region, an activation mechanism termed substrate presentation. For example, a protein is often palmitoylated and binds phosphatidylinositol 4,5-biphosphate (PIP_{2}). PIP_{2} is polyunsaturated and does not reside in lipid rafts. When the levels of PIP_{2} increase in the plasma membrane, the protein trafficks to PIP_{2} clusters where it can be activated directly by PIP_{2} (or another molecule that associates with PIP_{2}).

It is probable that other functions exist.

== Common types ==
Two types of lipid rafts have been proposed: planar lipid rafts (also referred to as non-caveolar, or glycolipid, rafts) and caveolae. Planar rafts are defined as being continuous with the plane of the plasma membrane (not invaginated) and by their lack of distinguishing morphological features. Caveolae, on the other hand, are flask shaped invaginations of the plasma membrane that contain caveolin proteins and are the most readily observed structures in lipid rafts. Caveolins are widely expressed in the brain, micro-vessels of the nervous system, endothelial cells, astrocytes, oligodendrocytes, Schwann cells, dorsal root ganglia and hippocampal neurons. Planar rafts contain flotillin proteins and are found in neurons where caveolae are absent. Both types have similar lipid composition (enriched in cholesterol and sphingolipids). Flotillin and caveolins can recruit signaling molecules into lipid rafts, thus playing an important role in neurotransmitter signal transduction. It has been proposed that these microdomains spatially organize signaling molecules to promote kinetically favorable interactions which are necessary for signal transduction. Conversely, these microdomains can also separate signaling molecules, inhibiting interactions and dampening signaling responses.

== Role in signal transduction ==
The specificity and fidelity of signal transduction are essential for cells to respond efficiently to changes in their environment. This is achieved in part by the differential localization of proteins that participate in signalling pathways. In the plasma membrane, one approach of compartmentalization utilizes lipid rafts.

One reasonable way to consider lipid rafts is that small rafts can form concentrating platforms after ligand binding activation for individual receptors. Lipid rafts have been found to be involved in a number of signal transduction processes, such as Immunoglobulin E signalling, T cell antigen receptor signalling, B cell antigen receptor signalling, EGF receptor signalling, insulin receptor signalling and so on. In order to illustrate these principles, detailed examples of signalling pathways that involve lipid rafts are described below.

=== Epidermal growth factor signaling ===
Epidermal growth factor (EGF) binds to EGF receptor, also known as HER-1 or ErbB1, to initiate transmembrane signaling. Lipid rafts have been suggested to play a bipartite role in this process. Certain aspects of lipid rafts inhibit EGF receptor function:

- the ganglioside component of lipid rafts was shown to inhibit receptor activation
- the membrane dipole potential, which was shown to be higher in lipid rafts than in the rest of the membrane, was demonstrated to inhibit EGF binding to its receptor
- EGF binding was shown to be inhibited by non-caveolar lipid rafts due to a decrease in the number of receptors available for ligand binding
- EGF and ErbB2 (HER-2) were shown to migrate out of lipid rafts or caveolae during or after activation
- disruption of lipid rafts was shown to induce ligand-independent activation of EGF receptor

At the same time lipid rafts seem to be necessary for or potentiate transmembrane signaling:

- sequestration of ErbB2 from lipid rafts have been shown to inhibit EGF-induced signaling
- the membrane dipole potential, which is higher in lipid rafts than in the rest of the membrane, potentiates EGF-induced signaling
- EGF was shown to bring about coalescence of individual lipid rafts, similar to what has been suggested to play a role in the activation of the T-cell receptor
- localization of EGF receptor to lipid rafts induces resistance to tyrosine kinase inhibitors

=== Immunoglobulin E signaling ===
Components for IgE signalling

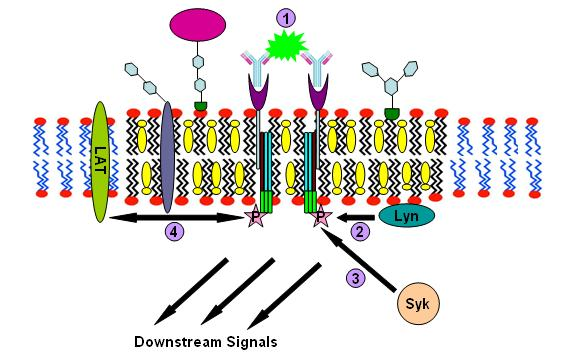
IgE signalling process

Immunoglobulin E (IgE) signaling is the first convincingly demonstrated signaling process which involves lipid rafts. Evidence for this fact includes decreased solubility of Fc-epsilon receptors (FcεR) in Triton X-100 from steady state to crosslinking state, formation of patches large enough to be visualized by fluorescence microscopy from gangliosides and GPI-anchored proteins, abolition of IgE signaling by surface cholesterol depletion with methyl-β-cyclodextrin and so on.

This signaling pathway can be described as follows: IgE first binds to Fc-epsilon receptors (FcεR) residing in the plasma membrane of mast cells and basophils through its Fc segment. FcεR is a tetramer consist of one α, one β and two γ chains. It is monomeric and binds one IgE molecule. The α chain binds IgE and the other three chains contain immune receptor tyrosine-based activation motifs (ITAM). Then oligomeric antigens bind to receptor-bound IgE to crosslink two or more of these receptors. This crosslinking then recruits doubly acylated non-receptor Src-like tyrosine kinase Lyn to phosphorylate ITAMs. After that, Syk family tyrosine kinases bind these phosphotyrosine residues of ITAMs to initiate the signaling cascade. Syk can, in turn, activate other proteins such as LAT. Through crosslinking, LAT can recruit other proteins into the raft and further amplify the signal.

=== T-cell antigen receptor signaling ===
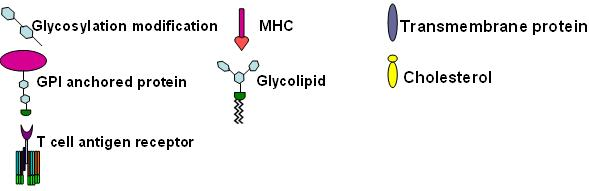
Components for T-cell antigen receptor signalling

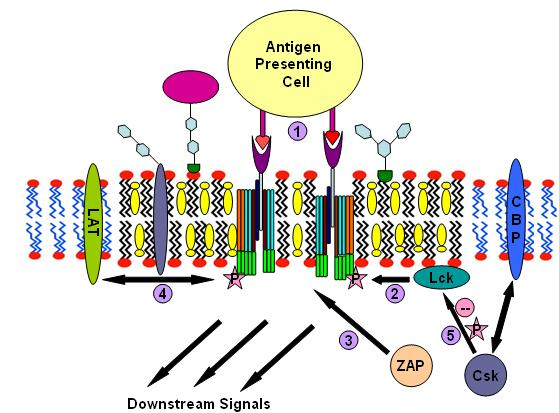
T-cell antigen receptor signalling process

T cell antigen receptor (TCR) is a molecule found on the surface of T lymphocytes (T cells). It is composed of αβ-heterodimers, CD3 (γδε) complex and ξ-homodimer. The α- and β- subunits contain extracellular binding sites for peptides that are presented by the major histocompatibility complex (MHC) class I and class II proteins on the surface of antigen presenting cells (APCs). The CD3 and ξ- subunits contain cytoplasmic ITAM motifs. During the signaling process, MHCs binding to TCRs brings two or more receptors together. This crosslinking, similar to IgE signaling, then recruits doubly acylated non-receptor Src-like tyrosine kinases to phosphorylate ITAM tyrosine residues. In addition to recruiting Lyn, TCR signaling also recruits Fyn.

Following this procedure, ZAP-70 (which is also different with IgE signalling) binds to phosphorylated ITAMs, which leads to its own activation and LAT activation. LAT activation is the source of signal amplification. Another difference between IgE and T cell antigen receptor signalling is that Lck activation by TCR could result in more severe raft clustering thus more signal amplification. One possible mechanism of down-regulating this signaling involves the binding of cytosolic kinase Csk to the raft associated protein CBP. Csk may then suppress the Src-family kinases through phosphorylation.

=== B-cell antigen receptor signaling ===
B cell antigen receptor (BCR) is a complex between a membrane bound Ig (mIg) molecule and a disulfide-linked Igα- Igβ heterodimer of two polypeptides. Igα and Igβ each contains an amino acid motif, called ITAM, whose sequence is D/ExxYxxL/Ix7YxxL/I.

The process of B cell antigen receptor signalling is similar to Immunoglobulin E signalling and T-cell antigen receptor signalling. It is commonly believed that other than BCR, lipid rafts play an important role in a number of the cell surface events involved in B cell activation. Their functions include signaling by BCR, modulation of that signaling by co-receptors, signaling by CD40, endocytosis of antigen bound to the BCR and its routing to late endosomes to facilitate loading of antigen-derived peptides onto class II MHC molecules, routing of those peptide/MHC-II complexes to the cell surface, and their participation in antigen presentation to T cells.

== As platforms for virus entry ==
Viruses, as obligate intracellular parasites, have to involve specific interaction of virus and cellular receptor expressed at the plasma membrane in order to enter cells. Accumulated evidence supports that viruses enter cells via penetration of specific membrane microdomains, including lipid rafts.

=== Nonenveloped virus ===
The best studied models of lipid rafts-related nonenveloped viral entry are simian virus 40 (SV40, Papovaviridae) and echovirus type 1 (EV1, Picornaviridae).

SV40 utilizes two different receptors to bind onto cell surface: ganglioside GM1 located in lipid rafts and major histocompatibility (MHC) class I molecule. Binding of SV40 with MHC class I molecules triggers receptor clustering and redistribution. SV40 may recruit more caveolae from the cytoplasm or even new caveolae formed at the site of entry. A cascade of virus-induced signaling events triggered by attachment results in caveolae-mediated endocytosis in about 20 min. In some cell types the virus can enter the caveosomes directly from lipid rafts in non-coated vesicles.

EV1 uses α2β1-integrin as cellular receptor. Multiple integrin heterodimers can bind to the adjacent sites of the virus capsid. Similar to SV40, attachment and binding with cells triggers clustering and relocation of integrin molecules from lipid rafts to the caveolae-like structures. Depletion of cholesterol in lipid rafts inhibits EV1 infection.

There are also viruses that use the non-caveolar raft-mediated endocytosis, such as Echovirus 11 (EV11, picornavirus). However, detailed mechanisms still need to be further characterized.

=== Enveloped virus ===
Influenza viruses bind to the cellular receptor sialic acid, which links to glycoconjugate on the cell surface, to initiate endocytosis. After transportation into late endosomes, low-pH-dependent conformation changes of HA induces fusion, and viral ribonucleoprotein complexes (RNP) are released by proton influx of viral ion channel M2 proteins that requires binding with cholesterol. Semliki Forest virus (SFV) and Sindbis virus (SIN) require cholesterol and sphingolipids in target membrane lipid rafts for envelope glycoprotein-mediated membrane fusion and entry. Human T-lymphotropic virus Type I (HTLV-1) enter cells via glucose transporter 1 (GLUT-1). Ebola virus and Marburg virus use folate receptor-α (FRα), which is a GPI-anchored protein, as a cellular receptor. Hepatitis B virus recognizes human complement receptor type 2 (CR2, or known as CD21). Human herpesvirus 6 (HHV-6) binds to human CD46 on host cell surface. All these viral receptors are located in lipid rafts or would be relocated into lipid rafts after infection.

Human Immunodeficiency virus (HIV), as a sexually transmitted animal virus, must first penetrate a barrier of epithelial cells, who do not express CD4 and chemokine receptors, to establish a productive infection. An alternative receptor for HIV-1 envelope glycoprotein on epithelial cells is glycosphingolipid galactosyl-ceramide (GalCer), which enriches at lipid raft.

=== SARS-Cov-2 ===
The SARS-CoV-2 virus that causes COVID-19 was shown to enter through endocytosis using lipid rafts. The omicron variant predominantly enters through endocytosis, presumably through lipid rafts. Hydroxychloroquine blocks the entry of SARS-CoV-2 by blocking ACE2 association with enodocytic lipids.

== History ==
Previously, it was widely accepted that phospholipids and membrane proteins were randomly distributed in cell membranes, according to the Singer-Nicolson fluid mosaic model, published in 1972. However, membrane microdomains were postulated in the 1970s using biophysical approaches by Stier & Sackmann and Klausner & Karnovsky. These microdomains were attributed to the physical properties and organization of lipid mixtures by Stier & Sackmann and Israelachvili et al.

In 1974, the effects of temperature on membrane behavior had led to the proposal of "clusters of lipids" in membranes and by 1975, data suggested that these clusters could be "quasicrystalline" regions within the more freely dispersed liquid crystalline lipid molecule. In 1978, X-Ray diffraction studies led to further development of the "cluster" idea defining the microdomains as "lipids in a more ordered state".

Karnovsky and co-workers formalized the concept of lipid domains in membranes in 1982. Karnovsky's studies showed heterogeneity in the lifetime decay of 1,6-diphenyl-1,3,5-hexatriene, which indicated that there were multiple phases in the lipid environment of the membrane. One type of microdomain is constituted by cholesterol and sphingolipids. They form because of the segregation of these lipids into a separate phase, demonstrated by Biltonen and Thompson and their coworkers. These microdomains ('rafts') were shown to exist also in cell membranes. Later, Kai Simons at the European Molecular Biology Laboratory (EMBL) in Germany and Gerrit van Meer from the University of Utrecht, Netherlands refocused interest on these membrane microdomains, enriched with lipids and cholesterol, glycolipids, and sphingolipids, present in cell membranes. Subsequently, they called these microdomains, lipid "rafts". The original concept of rafts was used as an explanation for the transport of cholesterol from the trans Golgi network to the plasma membrane. The idea was more formally developed in 1997 by Simons and Ikonen.

At the 2006 Keystone Symposium of Lipid Rafts and Cell Function, lipid rafts were defined as "small (10–200 nm), heterogeneous, highly dynamic, sterol- and sphingolipid-enriched domains that compartmentalize cellular processes. Small rafts can sometimes be stabilized to form larger platforms through protein-protein interactions" In recent years, lipid raft studies have tried to address some of the key issues that cause controversy in this field, including the size and lifetime of rafts.

Other questions yet to be answered include:

- What are the effects of membrane protein levels?
- What is the physiological function of lipid rafts?
- What effect does flux of membrane lipids have on raft formation?
- What effect do diet and drugs have on lipid rafts?
- What effect do proteins located at raft boundaries have on lipid rafts?

== Controversy ==
Lipid rafts were first proposed in 1997, and quickly expanded to a large research field in cell biology, centered around the Lipid Raft Hypothesis: "In this model, sphingolipids associate laterally with one another, probably through weak interactions between the carbohydrate heads of the glycosphingolipids. The sphingolipid head groups occupy larger excluded areas in the plane of the exoplasmic leaflet than do their predominantly saturated lipid hydrocarbon chains. Any voids between associating sphingolipids are filled by cholesterol molecules which function as spacers." Furthermore, proteins were hypothesized to be selectively recruited to these preexisting domains.

There is circumstantial evidence, and similar entities which have been suggested to bare a resemblance to rafts are easy to observe in biomimetic and isolated membranes, but they have still not (as of 2020) been directly, microscopically observed in vivo.

Certain lipids interact more favorably with each other than with other lipids for chemical and geometric reasons. Thus, lipid microdomains can form by physical chemistry. In particular, saturated lipids, sphingolipids, and sterols are attracted to each other, and repulsed by highly unsaturated lipids, at least in simplified lipid mixtures. This then means at low enough temperatures, it is energetically favorable for them to phase-separate to regions concentrated in saturated lipids, sphingolipids, and sterols, and regions concentrated in highly unsaturated lipids. However, the original lipid raft theory did not suggest phase separation as a mechanism. This is similar to oil drops on the surface of water, or spontaneous magnetization. The two phases are usually called "Lo/Ld" ("lipid-ordered/lipid-disordered"). Lipid rafts are often modeled as Lo-like nanodomains in an Ld-like surrounding membrane.

Cell membranes are not fully solubilized by non-ionic detergents such as Triton X-100 or CHAPS at low temperatures. Instead, some substance remains. This residual is called detergent-resistant membranes (DRMs). Lo-phase DRMs can be isolated on sucrose gradients. These lo-phase DRMs were originally thought of as isolated preexisting lipid rafts in vivo, and so they had been commonly used as model lipid rafts. However, by 2006, this had been shown to be different from preexisting rafts, prompting a major revision of the raft model.

It has been suggested that the lipid raft theory has become pseudoscience, since it survives by relabeling existing structures as "rafts" post hoc rather than verifying the predictions of the original lipid raft theory. Some researchers have even identified lipid raft theory with the more general theory of membrane organization, i.e. any form of lateral non-homogeneity in the cellular membrane serving a physiological function, regardless of whether it is driven by lipids. This may explain much of the confusion in the literature regarding the size, lifetime, and properties of lipid rafts. That is, "lipid raft" may not be a suitable label to describe the diversity of membrane regions that it is typically attached to.

The role of rafts in cellular signaling, trafficking, and structure has yet to be determined despite multiple experiments involving several different methods, and their very existence is controversial despite all the above. For example, Kervin and Overduin imply that lipid rafts are misconstrued protein islands, which they propose form through a proteolipid code.

Arguments against the existence of lipid rafts include the following:

- First, a line tension should exist between the Lα and Lo phases. This line has been seen in model membranes, but has not been readily observed in cell systems.
- Second, there is no consensus on lipid raft size, which has been reported anywhere between 1 and 1,000 nanometers.
- Third, the time scale of lipid raft existence is unknown. If lipid rafts exist, they may only occur on a time scale that is irrelevant to biological processes.
- Fourth, the entire membrane may exist in the Lo phase.

A first rebuttal to this point suggests that the Lo phase of the rafts is more tightly packed due to the intermolecular hydrogen bonding exhibited between sphingolipids and cholesterol that is not seen elsewhere.

A second argument questions the effectiveness of the experimental design when disrupting lipid rafts. Pike and Miller discuss potential pitfalls of using cholesterol depletion to determine lipid raft function. They noted that most researchers were using acute methods of cholesterol depletion, which disrupt the rafts, but also disrupt another lipid known as PI(4,5)P_{2}. PI(4,5)P_{2} plays a large role in regulating the cell's cytoskeleton, and disrupting PI(4,5)P_{2} causes some of the same results as this type of cholesterol depletion, including lateral diffusion of the proteins in the membrane. Because the methods disrupt both rafts and PI(4,5)P_{2}, Kwik et al. concluded that loss of a particular cellular function after cholesterol depletion cannot necessarily be attributed solely to lipid raft disruption, as other processes independent of rafts may also be affected. Finally, while lipid rafts are believed to be connected in some way to proteins, Edidin argues that proteins attract the lipids in the raft by interactions of proteins with the acyl chains on the lipids, and not the other way around.

== Visualization ==
One of the primary reasons for the controversy over lipid rafts has stemmed from the challenges of studying lipid rafts in living cells, which are not in thermodynamic equilibrium. Lipid rafts are small microdomains ranging from 10 to 200 nm in size. Due to their size being below the classical diffraction limit of a light microscope, lipid rafts have proved difficult to visualize directly. Currently synthetic membranes are studied; however, there are some drawbacks to using these membranes. First, synthetic membranes have a lower concentration of proteins compared to biomembranes. Also, it is difficult to model membrane-cytoskeletal interactions which are present in biomembranes. Other pitfalls include lack of natural asymmetry and inability to study the membranes in non-equilibrium conditions. Despite this, fluorescence microscopy is used extensively in the field. For example, fluorophores conjugated to cholera-toxin B-subunit, which binds to the raft constituent ganglioside GM1 is used extensively. Also used are lipophilic membrane dyes which either partition between rafts and the bulk membrane, or change their fluorescent properties in response to membrane phase. Laurdan is one of the prime examples of such a dye. Rafts may also be labeled by genetic expression of fluorescent fusion proteins such as Lck-GFP.

Manipulation of cholesterol is one of the most widely used techniques for studying lipid rafts. Sequestration (using filipin, nystatin or amphotericin), depletion and removal (using methyl-B-cyclodextrin) and inhibition of cholesterol synthesis (using HMG-CoA reductase inhibitors) are ways cholesterol are manipulated in lipid raft studies. These studies allow for the observations of effects on neurotransmitter signaling upon reduction of cholesterol levels.

Sharma and colleagues used combination of high resolution imaging and mathematical modeling to provide the view that raft proteins are organized into high density nanoclusters with radii ranging over 5–20 nm. Using measurements of fluorescence resonance energy transfer between the same probes (homo-FRET or fluorescence anisotropy), Sharma and colleagues reported that a fraction (20–40%) of GPI-anchored proteins are organized into high density clusters of 4–5 nm radius, each consisting of a few molecules and different GPI-anchored proteins. To combat the problems of small size and dynamic nature, single particle and molecule tracking using cooled, sensitive CCD cameras and total internal reflection (TIRF) microscopy is coming to prominence. This allows information of the diffusivity of particles in the membrane to be extracted as well as revealing membrane corrals, barriers and sites of confinement.

Other optical techniques are also used: Fluorescence Correlation and Cross-Correlation Spectroscopy (FCS/FCCS) can be used to gain information of fluorophore mobility in the membrane, Fluorescence Resonance Energy Transfer (FRET) can detect when fluorophores are in close proximity and optical tweezer techniques can give information on membrane viscosity.

Not only optical techniques, but also scanning probe techniques like atomic force microscopy (AFM) or Scanning Ion Conductance Microscopy (SICM) can be used to detect the topological and mechanical properties of synthetic lipids or native cell membranes isolated by cell unroofing.

Also used are dual polarisation interferometry, Nuclear Magnetic Resonance (NMR) although fluorescence microscopy remains the dominant technique. In the future it is hoped that super-resolution microscopy such as Stimulated Emission Depletion (STED) or various forms of structured illumination microscopy may overcome the problems imposed by the diffraction limit.

Other techniques used in the analysis of lipid rafts include ELISA, western blotting, and FACS.

== Giant unilamellar vesicles and model membrane studies ==
A major line of evidence for lipid rafts comes from giant unilamellar vesicles, where artificial lipid bilayers composed of ternary mixtures (a high-melting saturated phospholipid, a low-melting unsaturated phospholipid, and a sterol like cholesterol or ergosterol) reproducibly exhibit micron-scale liquid-ordered and liquid-disordered domain coexistence under fluorescence microscopy. Veatch & Keller mapped the phase diagram for such ternary lipid systems, showing how temperature and lipid composition dictate when and how phase separation happens. Beyond just seeing whether phases exist, subsequent work on giant unilamellar vesicles has quantified physical properties of those membranes, like domain diffusion, coarsening dynamics, line tension, and domain stability near critical points. Recent methodological work from Keller's lab also highlights the importance of how giant unilamellar vesicles are prepared: for example, a 2024 study by Weakly, Wilson, Goetz, Keller et al. found that while multiple standard preparation methods preserve lipid ratios faithfully, some (like emulsion transfer) can substantially skew cholesterol content and lipid saturation in certain lipid mixtures, which in turn alters phase behavior. This underscores how sensitive raft‐like domain formation is to experimental conditions. In more recent biophysical reconstitution studies, sterol-lipids have been shown to enable large-scale, liquid-liquid phase separation in giant unilamellar vesicles composed of only two components. Wilson et al. demonstrated that mixtures of a sterol-lipid (incorporating a sterol headgroup fused with an acyl chain) and a low-melting phospholipid robustly demix into micron-scale ordered and disordered domains, with sharp miscibility transition behavior. This minimal system simplifies experimental analysis (including tie-line determination) and supports the hypothesis that domain formation does not strictly require ternary lipid mixtures, so long as the sterol and lipid properties are tuned.

== Yeast as a model for micron-scale membrane domains ==
Recent imaging studies in Saccharomyces cerevisiae have provided unusually clear evidence of stable, micrometer-scale membrane domains, especially in vacuolar membranes under stress or nutrient limitation. Toulmay & Prinz showed that vacuole membranes form large, stable domains (on the order of several micrometers) that segregate vacuolar proteins into distinct regions in live yeast cells. These domains are influenced by environmental cues (e.g. nutrient deprivation, changes in medium pH), regulated by signaling pathways (such as the pH‐responsive Rim101 pathway), and depend on lipid composition, including sterols. This finding is especially significant because, in mammalian cells, lipid rafts have generally been difficult to visualize directly due to their smaller size (often nano-scale) and transient nature. The yeast vacuolar domains thus serve as one of the rare systems in which micrometer-scale ordered/disordered (Lo/Ld) lipid domains can be reliably observed with conventional (diffraction-limited) fluorescence microscopy, providing an important model for studying raft dynamics and domain formation in vivo.

Recent work in Saccharomyces cerevisiae has shown that the ergosterol biosynthetic pathway is finely tuned to promote membrane phase separation, with direct implications for the formation of ordered membrane domains (analogous to lipid rafts). By analyzing intermediates of ergosterol synthesis, combining cell biology, in vitro biochemistry, and molecular simulations, Juarez-Contreras et al. demonstrated that specific structural features of ergosterol intermediates, such as degree of saturation, ring structure, and side chain modifications, influence their interaction with phospholipids in ways that favor the formation of liquid-ordered (Lo) vs. liquid-disordered (Ld) bilayer phases. They found that this long, multistep pathway is not merely for biochemical complexity but helps balance lipid-lipid interactions so that membranes can more easily organize into ordered and disordered domains. In yeast vacuoles, which naturally phase-separate into ordered membrane domains under certain growth conditions, perturbing the ergosterol pathway (by altering synthesis of specific intermediates) disrupts domain formation. This provides strong evidence that sterol metabolic control is a key determinant of raft-like behavior in vivo. In addition to sterol regulation, sphingolipids play a decisive role in yeast vacuole domain formation. Kim & Budin showed that during entry into stationary phase, vacuole membranes become enriched in ergosterol and complex sphingolipids, with selective sorting of sphingolipids into the vacuole membrane driving micrometer-scale phase separation. Manipulating sphingolipid metabolism altered the onset and stability of these ordered/disordered domains, establishing a direct link between sphingolipid trafficking and raft-like organization in vivo. Vacuolar membrane phase separation is not static but physiologically regulated: Leveille et al. observed that the temperature at which vacuole membranes transition between one liquid phase and demixed two-liquid phases ("T_{mix}") shifts depending on the growth temperature of the cells. Cells grown at higher temperatures exhibited higher T_{mix}, indicating that yeast adjust membrane composition so that their vacuolar membranes remain near the miscibility-transition point under normal growth conditions. Interestingly, depleting ergosterol from vacuoles isolated in log-phase (when domains normally are absent) induced phase separation, which goes against assumptions that simply adding sterols always promotes ordered‐domain formation in vivo.
