= Homeoviscous adaptation =

Adaptation of the cell membrane lipid composition to maintain membrane fluidity

Homeoviscous adaptation is the adaptation of the cell membrane lipid composition to keep the adequate membrane fluidity.

== Function ==
The maintenance of proper cell membrane fluidity is of critical importance for the function and integrity of the cell, essential for the mobility and function of embedded proteins and lipids, diffusion of proteins and other molecules laterally across the membrane for signaling reactions, and proper separation of membranes during cell division.

== Mechanism ==
A fundamental biophysical determinant of membrane fluidity is the balance between saturated and unsaturated fatty acids. Regulating membrane fluidity is especially important in poikilothermic organisms such as bacteria, fungi, protists, plants, fish and other ectothermic animals. The general trend is an increase in unsaturated fatty acids at lower growth temperatures and an increase in saturated fatty acids at higher temperatures.

== Examples ==
Research has explored the importance of the homeoviscous adaptation of the cell membrane for a psychrotolerant bacteria living in the cold biosphere of earth. A similar effect was shown in allowing goldfish to adapt to freezing water temperatures.
