= Crystallization adjutant =

A crystallization adjutant is a material used to promote crystallization, normally in a context where a material does not crystallize naturally from a pure solution.

== Additives in Macromolecular Crystallization ==
In macromolecular crystallography, the term additive is used instead of adjutant. An additive can either interact directly with the protein, and become incorporated at a fixed position in the resulting crystal or have a role within the disordered solvent, that in protein crystals constitute roughly 50% of the lattice volume.

Polyethylene glycols of various molecular weights and high-ionic strength salts such as ammonium sulfate and sodium citrate that induce protein precipitation when used in high concentrations are classified as precipitants, while certain other salts such as zinc sulfate or calcium sulfate that may cause a protein to precipitate vigorously even when used in small amounts are considered adjutants. Crystallization adjutants are considered additives when they are effective at relatively low concentrations. The distinction between buffers and adjutants is also fuzzy. Buffer molecules can become part of the lattice (for example HEPES in becomes incorporated in crystals of human neutrophil collagenase) but their main use is to maintain the rather precise pH requirements for crystallization that many proteins have. Commonly used buffers such as citrate have a high ionic strength and at the typical buffer concentrations they also act as precipitants. Various species such as Ca^{2+} and Zn^{2+} are a biological requirement for certain proteins to fold correctly and certain co-factors are needed to maintain a well defined conformation. Certain strategies, like replacing precipitants and buffers with others intended to have a similar effect, have been used to differentiate between the roles played in protein crystallization by the various components in the crystallization solution.

== Additives for Membrane Protein Crystallization ==
For membrane proteins, the situation is more complicated because the system that is being crystallized is not the membrane protein itself but the micellar system in which the membrane protein is embedded. The size of the protein-detergent mixed micelles are affected by both additives and detergents which will strongly influence the crystals obtained. In addition to varying the concentration of primary detergents, additives (lipids and alcohols) and secondary detergents can be used to modulate the size and shape of the detergent micelles. By reducing the size of the mixed micelles lattice forming protein-protein contacts are encouraged. Lipid cubic phases, spontaneous self-assembling liquid crystals or lipid mesophases have been used successfully in the crystallization of integral membrane proteins. Temperature, salts, detergents, various additives are used in this system to tailor the cubic phase to suit the target protein. Typical detergents used are n-dodecyl-β-d-maltopyranoside, n-decyl-β-d-glucopyranoside, lauryldimethylamine oxide LDAO, n-hexyl-β-d-glucopyranoside, n-nonyl-β-d-glucopyranoside and n-octyl-β-d-glucopyranoside; the various lipids are dioleoyl phosphatidylcholine, dioleoyl phosphatidylethanolamine and monoolein.
