= Saccharolipid =

Class of chemical compounds

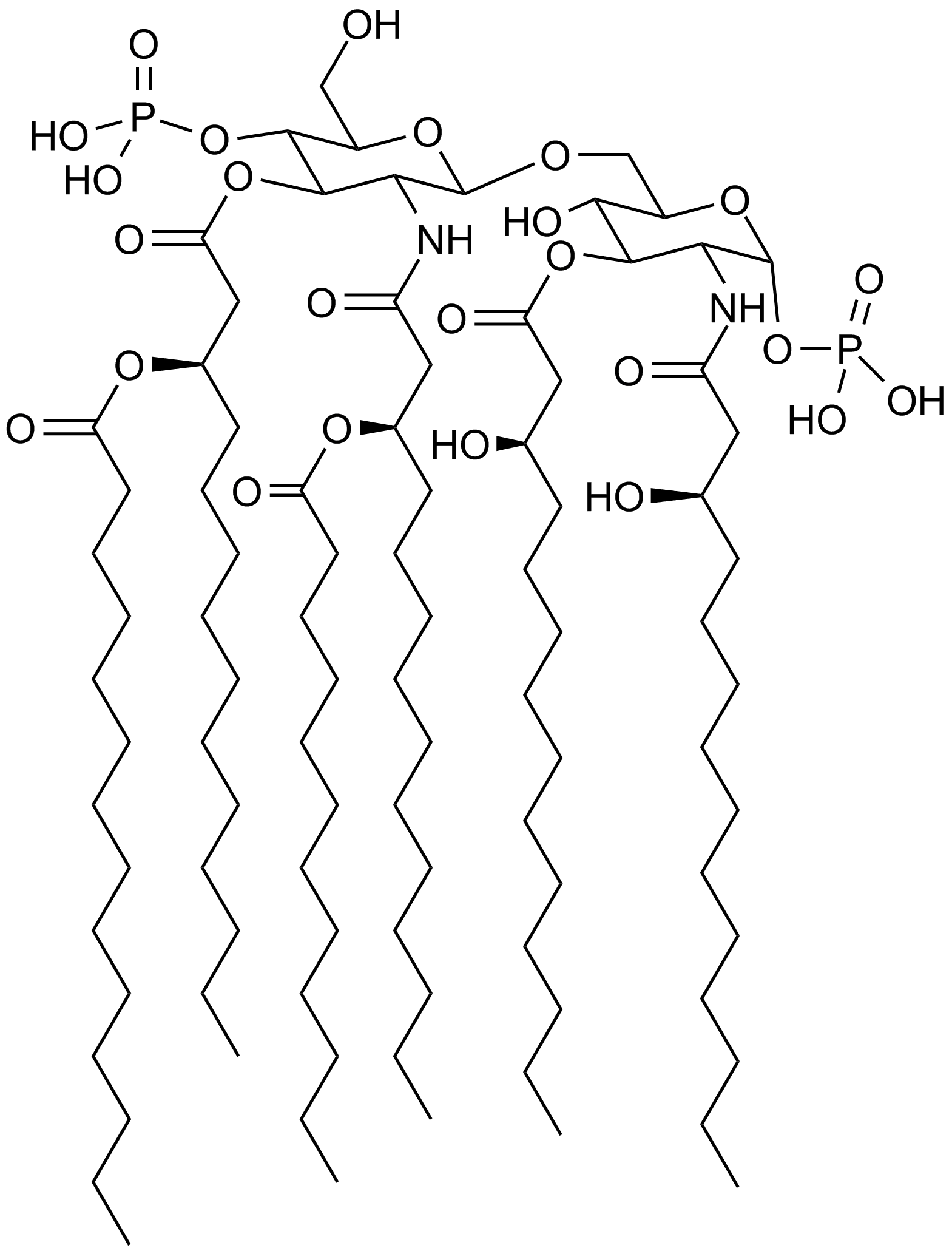
Chemical structure of lipid A as found in E. coli

Saccharolipids are chemical compounds containing fatty acids linked directly to a sugar backbone, forming structures that are compatible with membrane bilayers. In the saccharolipids, a monosaccharide substitutes for the glycerol backbone present in glycerolipids and glycerophospholipids. The most familiar saccharolipids are the acylated glucosamine precursors of the lipid A component of the lipopolysaccharides in Gram-negative bacteria. Typical lipid A molecules are disaccharides of glucosamine, which are derivatized with as many as seven fatty-acyl chains. The minimal lipopolysaccharide required for growth in Escherichia coli is Kdo_{2}-Lipid A, a hexa-acylated disaccharide of glucosamine (LipidA) that is glycosylated with two 3-deoxy-D-manno-octulosonic acid (Kdo) residues.

Acyl-trehaloses, such as Mycobacterial cord factor are further examples of sacharolipids.

While terms are sometimes used interchangeably, saccharolipids are distinct from glycolipids as the latter are defined by IUPAC to have the sugar bound by a glycosidic linkage to a fatty acyl. The LIPID MAPS classification system also defines saccharolipids as a distinct category of lipids.

== See also ==
- Lipids
