= Liquid ordered phase =

Regarding biological membranes, the liquid ordered phase is a liquid crystalline phase of a lipid bilayer, and is of significant biological importance. It occurs in many lipid mixtures combining cholesterol with a phospholipid and/or sphingolipids e.g. sphingomyelin. This phase has been related to lipid rafts that may exist in plasma membranes.

== Definition ==
The liquid ordered phase can be defined as:

- fluid and lamellar phase, including the Wide angle X-ray scattering pattern centered by broad diffraction peak at 4.2Å
- acyl hydrocarbon chains are in the all-trans state
- rapid lateral diffusion
- ^{2}H-NMR quadrupolar splitting is ca. 50 kHz

== History ==
This was first called the liquid ordered phase by Ipsen et al. (1987). However, it has also been called the LG_{I} subgel phase by Huang et al. (1993) and the β phase by Vist and Davis (1990).
