= Emulsion test =

Chemical Test

The emulsion test is a simple method used in educational settings to determine the presence of lipids using wet chemistry. The procedure is for the sample to be suspended in ethanol, allowing lipids present to dissolve (lipids are soluble in alcohols). The liquid (alcohol with dissolved fat) is then decanted into water. Since lipids do not dissolve in water while ethanol does, when the ethanol is diluted, it falls out of the solution to give a cloudy white emulsion. This method is not typically used in research or industry.
