= Annular lipid shell =

Lipids or lipidic molecules which preferentially bind to membrane proteins in cells

Annular lipids (also called shell lipids or boundary lipids) are a set of lipids or lipidic molecules which preferentially bind or stick to the surface of membrane proteins in biological cells. They constitute a layer, or an annulus/ shell, of lipids which are partially immobilized due to the existence of lipid-protein interactions. Polar headgroups of these lipids bind to the hydrophilic part of the membrane protein(s) at the inner and outer surfaces of lipid bilayer membrane. The hydrophobic surface of the membrane proteins is bound to the apposed lipid fatty acid chains of the membrane bilayer. For integral membrane proteins spanning the thickness of the membrane bilayer, these annular/shell lipids may act like a lubricating layer on the proteins' surfaces, thereby facilitating almost free rotation and lateral diffusion of membrane proteins within the 2-dimensional expanse of the biological membrane(s). Outside the layer of shell/annular lipids, lipids are not tied down to protein molecules. However, they may be slightly restricted in their segmental motion freedom due to mild peer pressure of protein molecules, if present in high concentration, which arises from extended influence of protein-lipid interaction. Membrane areas away from protein molecules contain lamellar phase bulk lipids, which are largely free from any restraining effects due to protein-lipid interactions. Thermal denaturation of membrane proteins may destroy the secondary and tertiary structure of membrane proteins, exposing newer surfaces to membrane lipids and therefore increasing the number of lipids molecules in the annulus/shell layer. This phenomenon can be studied by the spin label electron paramagnetic resonance technique. The protein-lipid binding are dependent on OmpF pH levels and their structural features and location of the membranes. When said lipids bind to OmpF it is sensitive to changes that may occur in the electrospray polarity.

== See more ==
- Lipid bilayer
- Membrane lipids
