= TMPad =

Repository of helix-helix interactions in membrane proteins

Content
- Description: helix-packing folds in transmembrane proteins.

Contact
- Research center: Academia Sinica
- Laboratory: Bioinformatics Laboratory, Institute of Information Science
- Authors: Allan Lo
- Primary citation: Lo & al. (2011)

Access
- Website: http://bio-cluster.iis.sinica.edu.tw/TMPad

TMPad (the TransMembrane Protein Helix-Packing Database) is a repository of helix-helix interactions in membrane proteins

== See also ==
- Alpha helix
- membrane protein
