= Intracellular space =

Interior space of the plasma membrane

Intracellular space is the interior space of the plasma membrane. It contains about two-thirds of TBW. Cellular rupture may occur if the intracellular space becomes dehydrated, or if the opposite happens, where it becomes too bloated. Thus it is important for the liquid to stay in optimal quantity.

== See also ==
- Extracellular space
