= Lipid microdomain =

Lipid microdomains are formed when lipids undergo lateral phase separations yielding stable coexisting lamellar domains. These phase separations can be induced by changes in temperature, pressure, ionic strength or by the addition of divalent cations or proteins. The question of whether such lipid microdomains observed in model lipid systems also exist in biomembranes had motivated considerable research efforts. Lipid domains are not readily isolated and examined as unique species, in contrast to the examples of lateral heterogeneity. One can disrupt the membrane and demonstrate a heterogeneous range of composition in the population of the resulting vesicles or fragments. Electron microscopy can also be used to demonstrate lateral inhomogeneities in biomembranes.

Often, lateral heterogeneity has been inferred from biophysical techniques where the observed signal indicates multiple populations rather than the expected homogeneous population. An example of this is the measurement of the diffusion coefficient of a fluorescent lipid analog in soybean protoplasts. Membrane microheterogeneity is sometimes inferred from the behavior of enzymes, where the enzymatic activity does not appear to be correlated with the average lipid physical state exhibited by the bulk of the membrane. Often, the methods suggest regions with different lipid fluidity, as would be expected of coexisting gel and liquid crystalline phases within the biomembrane. This is also the conclusion of a series of studies where differential effects of perturbation caused by cis and trans fatty acids are interpreted in terms of preferential partitioning of the two liquid crystalline and gel-like domains.

== See also ==
- Biochemistry
- Essential fatty acid
- Lipid raft
- PIP2 domain
- Lipid signaling
- Saturated and unsaturated compounds
