= Membrane protein =

Proteins that are part of, or interact with, biological membranes

Membrane protein complexes of photosynthesis in the thylakoid membrane

Membrane proteins are common proteins that are part of, or interact with, biological membranes. Membrane proteins fall into several broad categories depending on their location. Integral membrane proteins are a permanent part of a cell membrane and can either penetrate the membrane (transmembrane) or associate with one or the other side of a membrane (integral monotopic). Peripheral membrane proteins are transiently associated with the cell membrane.

Membrane proteins are common, and medically important—about a third of all human proteins are membrane proteins, and these are targets for more than half of all drugs. Nonetheless, compared to other classes of proteins, determining membrane protein structures remains a challenge in large part due to the difficulty in establishing experimental conditions that can preserve the correct (native) conformation of the protein in isolation from its native environment.

== Embedding of proteins into the membrane ==
When transmembrane proteins are translated from RNA they have start-transfer-sequences and stop-transfer-sequences before their posttranslational modifications occurs. The start-transfer-sequence is used to recruit a signal recognition particle(SRP) which consequently stops translation until it binds to a SRP-receptor on the surface of the lipid bilayer. Translocons are channels in the membrane which allow proteins to be moved across the membrane and the Ribosome synthesizes the polypeptide directly through it. The start-transfer-sequence is attached to the Translocon and is cleaved posttranslationally along with the stop-transfer-sequence. Many other complex pathways for embedding proteins exist, specific to eukaryotes and prokaryotes respectively.

== Function ==
Membrane proteins perform a variety of functions vital to the survival of organisms:

- Membrane receptor proteins relay signals between the cell's internal and external environments.
- Transport proteins move molecules and ions across the membrane. They can be categorized according to the Transporter Classification database.
- Membrane enzymes may have many activities, such as oxidoreductase, transferase or hydrolase.
- Cell adhesion molecules allow cells to identify each other and interact. For example, proteins involved in immune response.

The localization of proteins in membranes can be predicted reliably using hydrophobicity analyses of protein sequences, i.e. the localization of hydrophobic amino acid sequences.

=== Integral membrane proteins ===
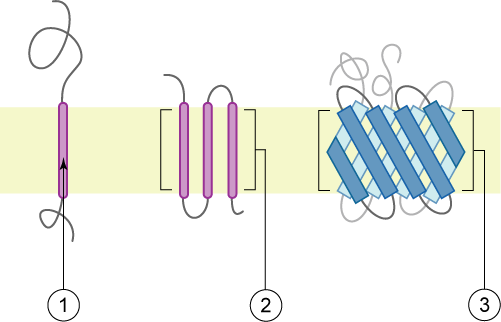
Schematic representation of transmembrane proteins: 1. a single transmembrane α-helix (bitopic membrane protein) 2. a polytopic transmembrane α-helical protein 3. a polytopic transmembrane β-sheet protein The membrane is represented in light-brown.

Integral membrane proteins are permanently attached to the membrane. Such proteins can be separated from the biological membranes only using detergents, nonpolar solvents, or sometimes denaturing agents. They can be classified according to their relationship with the bilayer:

- Integral polytopic proteins are transmembrane proteins that span across the membrane more than once. These proteins may have different transmembrane topology. These proteins have one of two structural architectures:
  - Helix bundle proteins, which are present in all types of biological membranes;
  - Beta barrel proteins, which are found only in outer membranes of Gram-negative bacteria, and outer membranes of mitochondria and chloroplasts.
- Bitopic proteins are transmembrane proteins that span across the membrane only once. Transmembrane helices from these proteins have significantly different amino acid distributions to transmembrane helices from polytopic proteins.
- Integral monotopic proteins are integral membrane proteins that are attached to only one side of the membrane and do not span the whole way across.

=== Peripheral membrane proteins ===
Schematic representation of the different types of interaction between monotopic membrane proteins and the cell membrane: 1. interaction by an amphipathic α-helix parallel to the membrane plane (in-plane membrane helix) 2. interaction by a hydrophobic loop 3. interaction by a covalently bound membrane lipid (lipidation) 4. electrostatic or ionic interactions with membrane lipids (e.g. through a calcium ion)

Peripheral membrane proteins are temporarily attached either to the lipid bilayer or to integral proteins by a combination of hydrophobic, electrostatic, and other non-covalent interactions. Peripheral proteins dissociate following treatment with a polar reagent, such as a solution with an elevated pH or high salt concentrations.

Integral and peripheral proteins may be post-translationally modified, with added fatty acid, diacylglycerol or prenyl chains, or GPI (glycosylphosphatidylinositol), which may be anchored in the lipid bilayer.

=== Polypeptide toxins ===
Polypeptide toxins and many antibacterial peptides, such as colicins or hemolysins, and certain proteins involved in apoptosis, are sometimes considered a separate category. These proteins are water-soluble but can undergo significant conformational changes, form oligomeric complexes and associate irreversibly or reversibly with the lipid bilayer.

== In genomes ==
Membrane proteins, like soluble globular proteins, fibrous proteins, and disordered proteins, are common. It is estimated that 20–30% of all genes in most genomes encode for membrane proteins. For instance, about 1000 of the ~4200 proteins of E. coli are thought to be membrane proteins, 600 of which have been experimentally verified to be membrane resident. In humans, current thinking suggests that fully 30% of the genome encodes membrane proteins.

== In disease ==
Membrane proteins are the targets of over 50% of all modern medicinal drugs. Among the human diseases in which membrane proteins have been implicated are heart disease, Alzheimer's and cystic fibrosis.

== Purification of membrane proteins ==
Although membrane proteins play an important role in all organisms, their purification has historically, and continues to be, a huge challenge for protein scientists. In 2008, 150 unique structures of membrane proteins were available, and by 2019 only 50 human membrane proteins had had their structures elucidated. In contrast, approximately 25% of all proteins are membrane proteins. Their hydrophobic surfaces make structural and especially functional characterization difficult. Detergents can be used to render membrane proteins water-soluble, but these can also alter protein structure and function. Making membrane proteins water-soluble can also be achieved through engineering the protein sequence, replacing selected hydrophobic amino acids with hydrophilic ones, taking great care to maintain secondary structure while revising overall charge.

Affinity chromatography is one of the best solutions for purification of membrane proteins. The polyhistidine-tag is a commonly used tag for membrane protein purification, and the alternative rho1D4 tag has also been successfully used.

== See also ==
- Annular lipid shell
- Carrier protein
- Inner nuclear membrane proteins
- Ion channel
- Ion pump (biology)
- List of MeSH codes (D12.776)
- Receptor (biochemistry)
- TMPad (TransMembrane Protein Helix-Packing Database)
- Transmembrane proteins
