= Extracellular space =

Region(s) of a multicellular organism outside its cells

Extracellular space refers to the part of a multicellular organism outside the cells, usually taken to be outside the plasma membranes, and occupied by extracellular fluid. This is distinguished from intracellular space, which is inside the cells.

The composition of the extracellular space includes metabolites, ions, proteins, and many other substances that might affect cellular function. For example, neurotransmitters "jump" from cell to cell to facilitate the transmission of an electric current in the nervous system. Hormones also act by travelling the extracellular space towards cell receptors.

In cell biology, molecular biology and related fields, the word extracellular (or sometimes extracellular space) means "outside the cell". This space is usually taken to be outside the plasma membranes, and occupied by fluid (see extracellular matrix). The term is used in contrast to intracellular (inside the cell).

According to the Gene Ontology, the extracellular space is a cellular component defined as: "That part of a multicellular organism outside the cells proper, usually taken to be outside the plasma membranes, and occupied by fluid. For multicellular organisms, the extracellular space refers to everything outside a cell, but still within the organism (excluding the extracellular matrix). Gene products from a multi-cellular organism that are secreted from a cell into the interstitial fluid or blood can therefore be annotated to this term".

The composition of the extracellular space includes metabolites, ions, various proteins and non-protein substances (e.g. DNA, RNA, lipids, microbial products etc.), and particles such as extracellular vesicles that might affect cellular function. For example, hormones, growth factors, cytokines and chemokines act by travelling the extracellular space towards biochemical receptors on cells. Other proteins that are active outside the cell are various enzymes, including digestive enzymes (Trypsin, Pepsin), extracellular proteinases (Matrix metalloproteinases, ADAMTSs, Cathepsins) and antioxidant enzymes (extracellular superoxide dismutase). Often, proteins present in the extracellular space are stored outside the cells by attaching to various extracellular matrix components (Collagens, Proteoglycans, etc.). In addition, extracellular matrix proteolytic products are also present in the extracellular space, especially in tissues undergoing remodelling [2].
