= History of research into the origin of life =

The history of research into the origin of life encompasses theories about how life began, from ancient times with the philosophy of Aristotle through to the Miller–Urey experiment in 1952.

== Panspermia ==
Panspermia is the hypothesis that life exists throughout the universe, distributed by meteoroids, asteroids, comets and planetoids. It does not attempt to explain how life originated, but shifts the origin to another heavenly body. The advantage is that life is not required to have formed on each planet it occurs on, but rather in a single location, and then spread across the galaxy to other star systems via cometary or meteorite impact. Evidence for this is scant, but it finds some support in studies of Martian meteorites found in Antarctica and of extremophile microbes' survival in outer space tests. Terrestrial bacteria, particularly Deinococcus radiodurans, highly resistant to environmental hazards, could survive for at least three years in outer space, based on studies on the International Space Station.

An extreme speculation is that the biochemistry of life could have begun as early as 17 My (million years) after the Big Bang, during a supposedly habitable epoch, and that life may exist throughout the universe. Carl Zimmer has speculated that the chemical conditions, including boron, molybdenum and oxygen needed to create RNA, may have been better on early Mars than on early Earth. If so, life-suitable molecules originating on Mars would have later migrated to Earth via meteor ejections.

== Spontaneous generation ==
=== General acceptance until 19th century ===
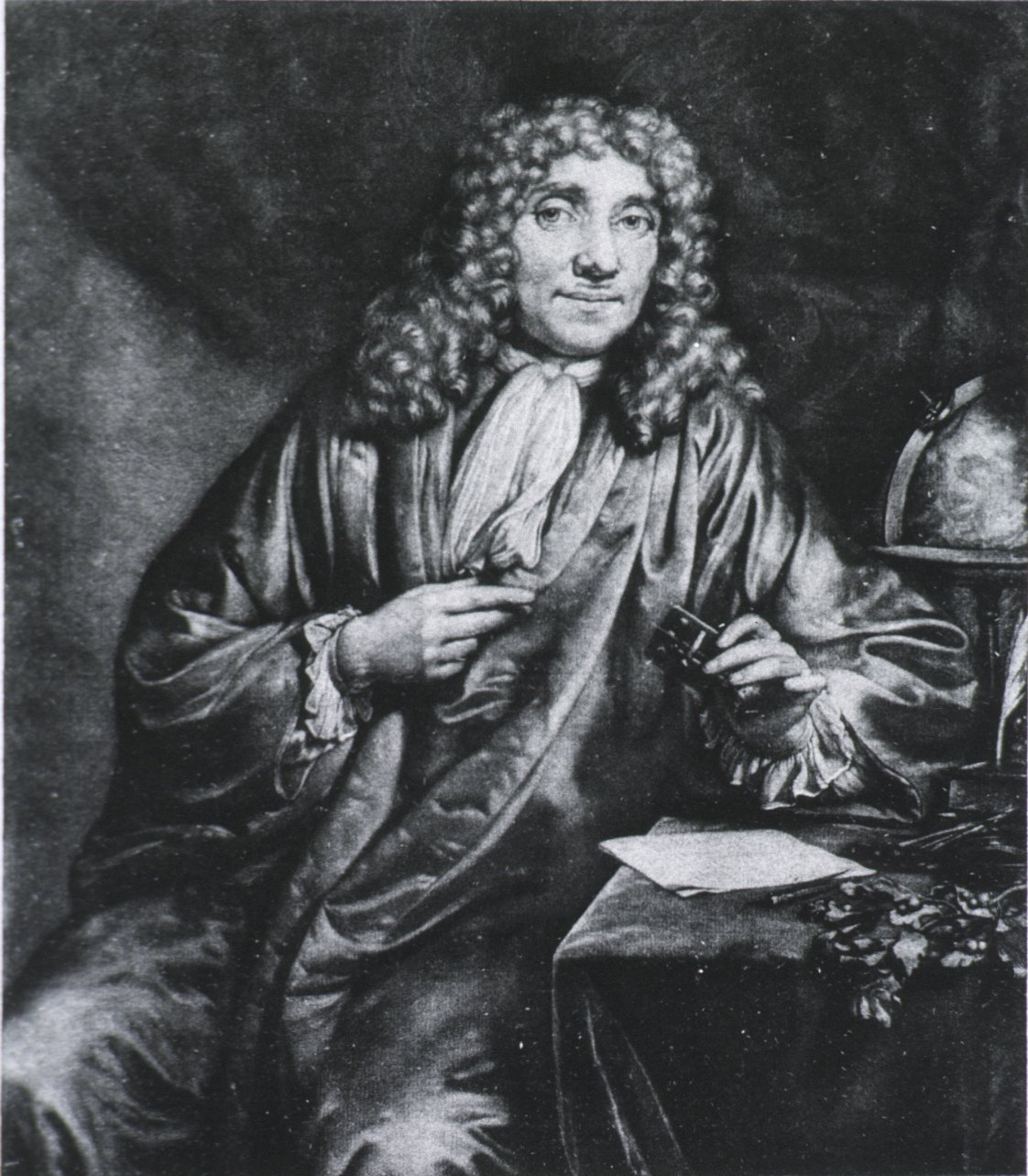
Antonie van Leeuwenhoek

Traditional religion attributed the origin of life to deities who created the natural world. Spontaneous generation, the first naturalistic theory of abiogenesis, goes back to Aristotle and ancient Greek philosophy, and continued to have support in Western scholarship until the 19th century. The theory held that "lower" animals are generated by decaying organic substances. Aristotle stated that, for example, aphids arise from dew on plants, flies from putrid matter, mice from dirty hay, and crocodiles from rotting sunken logs. The basic idea was that life was continuously created as a result of chance events. In the 17th century, people began to question spontaneous generation, in works like Thomas Browne's Pseudodoxia Epidemica. His contemporary, Alexander Ross, erroneously rebutted him. In 1665, Robert Hooke published the first drawings of a microorganism. In 1676, Antonie van Leeuwenhoek drew and described microorganisms, probably protozoa and bacteria. Many felt their existence supported spontaneous generation, since they seemed too simplistic for sexual reproduction, and asexual reproduction: cell division had not yet been observed. Van Leeuwenhoek disagreed with spontaneous generation, and by the 1680s convinced himself, using experiments ranging from sealed and open meat incubation and the close study of insect reproduction, that the theory was incorrect. In 1668 Francesco Redi showed that no maggots appeared in meat when flies were prevented from laying eggs. In 1768, Lazzaro Spallanzani demonstrated that microbes were present in the air, and could be killed by boiling. In 1861, Louis Pasteur's experiments demonstrated that organisms such as bacteria and fungi do not spontaneously appear in sterile, nutrient-rich media, but could only appear by invasion from without.

=== Considered disproven in 19th century ===
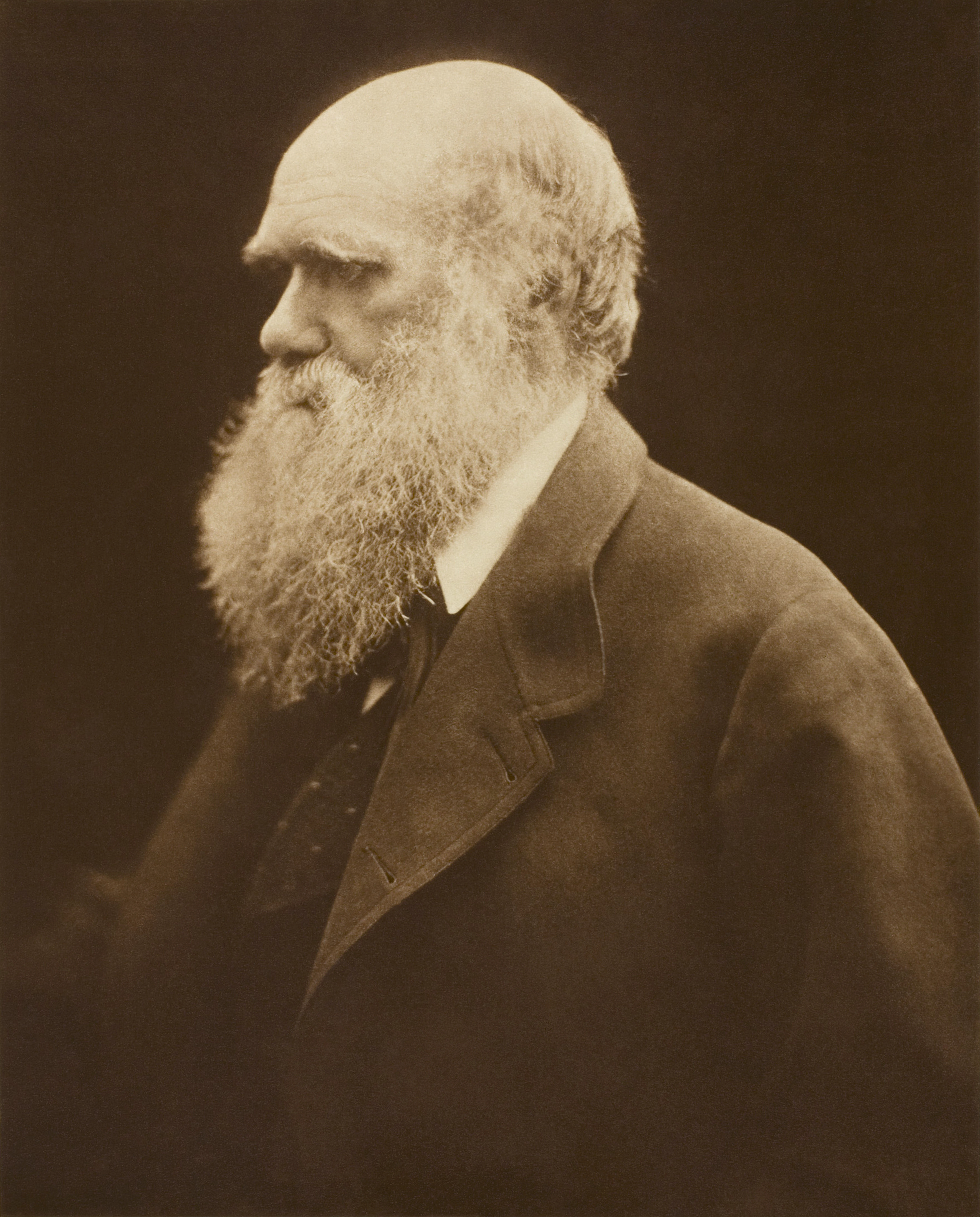
Charles Darwin in 1879

By the middle of the 19th century, biogenesis was supported by so much evidence that spontaneous generation had been effectively disproven. A key demonstration in 1859 was Louis Pasteur's swan-neck flask experiment, in which boiled beef broth remained free of microbial growth because the flask's long, curved neck prevented airborne contaminants from reaching the broth; when the neck was broken, microbes quickly appeared, supporting the conclusion that microorganisms arise only from other microorganisms. Pasteur remarked about this finding, "Never will the doctrine of spontaneous generation recover from the mortal blow struck by this simple experiment." This gave a mechanism by which life diversified from a few simple organisms to a variety of complex forms. Today, scientists agree that all current life descends from earlier life, which has become progressively more complex and diverse through Charles Darwin's mechanism of evolution by natural selection.

Darwin wrote to J.D. Hooker on 29 March 1863 stating that "It is mere rubbish, thinking at present of the origin of life; one might as well think of the origin of matter". In On the Origin of Species, he had referred to life having been "created", by which he "really meant 'appeared' by some wholly unknown process", but had soon regretted using the Old Testament term "creation".

== Oparin: Primordial soup hypothesis ==
There is no single generally accepted model for the origin of life. Scientists have proposed several plausible hypotheses which share some common elements. While differing in details, these hypotheses are based on the framework laid out by Alexander Oparin (in 1924) and John Haldane (in 1929), that the first molecules constituting the earliest cells

. . . were synthesized under natural conditions by a slow process of molecular evolution, and these molecules then organized into the first molecular system with properties with biological order".

Oparin and Haldane suggested that the atmosphere of the early Earth may have been chemically reducing in nature, composed primarily of methane (CH_{4}), ammonia (NH_{3}), water (H_{2}O), hydrogen sulfide (H_{2}S), carbon dioxide (CO_{2}) or carbon monoxide (CO), and phosphate (PO_{4}^{3−}), with molecular oxygen (O_{2}) and ozone (O_{3}) either rare or absent. According to later models, the atmosphere in the late Hadean period consisted largely of nitrogen (N_{2}) and carbon dioxide, with smaller amounts of carbon monoxide, hydrogen (H_{2}), and sulfur compounds; while it did lack molecular oxygen and ozone, it was not as chemically reducing as Oparin and Haldane supposed.

No new notable research or hypothesis on the subject appeared until 1924, when Oparin reasoned that atmospheric oxygen prevents the synthesis of certain organic compounds that are necessary building blocks for life. In his book The Origin of Life, he proposed (echoing Darwin) that the "spontaneous generation of life" that had been attacked by Pasteur did, in fact, occur once, but was now impossible because the conditions found on the early Earth had changed, and preexisting organisms would immediately consume any spontaneously generated organism. Oparin argued that a "primeval soup" of organic molecules could be created in an oxygenless atmosphere through the action of sunlight. These would combine in ever more complex ways until they formed coacervate droplets. These droplets would "grow" by fusion with other droplets, and "reproduce" through fission into daughter droplets, and so have a primitive metabolism in which factors that promote "cell integrity" survive, and those that do not become extinct. Many modern theories of the origin of life still take Oparin's ideas as a starting point.

About this time, Haldane suggested that the Earth's prebiotic oceans (quite different from their modern counterparts) would have formed a "hot dilute soup" in which organic compounds could have formed. Robert Shapiro has summarized the "primordial soup" theory of Oparin and Haldane in its "mature form" as follows:

1. The early Earth had a chemically reducing atmosphere.
2. This atmosphere, exposed to energy in various forms, produced simple organic compounds ("monomers").
3. These compounds accumulated in a "soup" that may have concentrated at various locations (shorelines, oceanic vents etc.).
4. By further transformation, more complex organic polymers—and ultimately life—developed in the soup.

N. W. Pirie coined the term biopoesis in 1953 to refer to the origin of life. He believed that this term better communicated the concept of life coming from non-life, arguing that abiogenesis was not appropriate due to its etymology and that the term carried a residual relationship to the discredited theory of spontaneous generation. Though it enjoyed modest usage in the field through the 1990s, biopoesis is now less commonly used in the scientific literature than abiogenesis, which, in turn, is used far less than origin of life.

In 1967, J. D. Bernal suggested that biopoesis occurred in three "stages":

1. the origin of biological monomers
2. the origin of biological polymers
3. the evolution from molecules to cells

He proposed that evolution began between stages 1 and 2, considering the third stage—when biological reactions became enclosed within a cellular boundary—the most challenging to achieve. Modern work on the way that cell membranes self-assemble and work on micropores in various substrates may be a key step towards understanding the development of independent free-living cells.

== Miller–Urey experiment ==
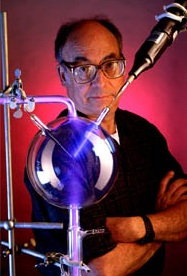
Stanley Miller

In 1952, Stanley Miller and Harold Urey performed an experiment that demonstrated how organic molecules could have spontaneously formed from inorganic precursors under conditions like those posited by the Oparin–Haldane hypothesis. The Miller–Urey experiment used a highly reducing mixture of gases—methane, ammonia, and hydrogen, as well as water vapor—to form simple organic monomers such as amino acids. The mixture of gases was cycled through an apparatus that delivered electrical sparks to the mixture. After one week, it was found that about 10% to 15% of the carbon in the system was then in the form of a racemic mixture of organic compounds, including amino acids, which are the building blocks of proteins. This provided direct experimental support for the second point of the "soup" theory, and it is around the remaining two points of the theory that much of the debate centers. A 2011 reanalysis of the saved vials has uncovered more biochemicals than originally discovered in the 1950s, including 23 amino acids, not just five.

2020 studies suggest that the primeval atmosphere of the Earth was much different than the conditions used in the Miller–Urey studies.

== Sources ==
- Bernal, J. D. (1951). The Physical Basis of Life. London: Routledge & Kegan Paul. LCCN 51005794.
- Bernal, J. D. (1967) [Reprinted work by A.I. Oparin originally published 1924; Moscow: The Moscow Worker]. The Origin of Life. The Weidenfeld and Nicolson Natural History. Translation of Oparin by Ann Synge. London: Weidenfeld & Nicolson. LCCN 67098482.
- Bondeson, Jan (1999). The Feejee Mermaid and Other Essays in Natural and Unnatural History. Ithaca, NY: Cornell University Press. ISBN 978-0-8014-3609-3. LCCN 98038295.
- Bryson, Bill (2004). A Short History of Nearly Everything. London: Black Swan. ISBN 978-0-552-99704-1. OCLC 55589795.
- Dobell, Clifford (1960) [Originally published 1932; New York: Harcourt, Brace & Company]. Antony van Leeuwenhoek and His 'Little Animals'. New York: Dover Publications. LCCN 60002548.
- Kasting, James F. (12 February 1993). "Earth's Early Atmosphere" (PDF). Science. 259 (5097): 920–926. Bibcode:1993Sci...259..920K. doi:10.1126/science.11536547. PMID 11536547. S2CID 21134564. Archived from the original (PDF) on 10 October 2015.
- Kauffman, Stuart (1995). At Home in the Universe: The Search for Laws of Self-Organization and Complexity. New York: Oxford University Press. ISBN 978-0-19-509599-9. LCCN 94025268.
- Lennox, James G. (2001). Aristotle's Philosophy of Biology: Studies in the Origins of Life Science. Cambridge Studies in Philosophy and Biology. Cambridge, UK; New York: Cambridge University Press. ISBN 978-0-521-65976-5. LCCN 00026070.
- Oparin, A.I. (1953) [Originally published 1938; New York: The Macmillan Company]. The Origin of Life. Translation and new introduction by Sergius Morgulis (2nd ed.). Mineola, NY: Dover Publications. ISBN 978-0-486-49522-4. LCCN 53010161.
- Ross, Alexander (1652). Arcana Microcosmi. Vol. Book II. London.
- Shapiro, Robert (1987). Origins: A Skeptic's Guide to the Creation of Life on Earth. Toronto; New York: Bantam Books. ISBN 978-0-553-34355-7.
- Sheldon, Robert B. (22 September 2005). Hoover, Richard B.; Levin, Gilbert V.; Rozanov, Alexei Y.; Gladstone, G. Randall (eds.). Historical Development of the Distinction between Bio- and Abiogenesis (PDF). Astrobiology and Planetary Missions. Vol. 5906. Bellingham, WA: SPIE. doi:10.1117/12.663480. ISBN 978-0-8194-5911-4. LCCN 2005284378. Proceedings of the SPIE held at San Diego, CA, 31 July–2 August 2005
- Tyndall, John (1905) [Originally published 1871; London; New York: Longmans, Green & Co.; D. Appleton and Company]. Fragments of Science. Vol. 2 (6th ed.). New York: P.F. Collier & Sons. OCLC 726998155.
