= Alexander Oparin =

Soviet biochemist (1894–1980)

- Александр Опарин
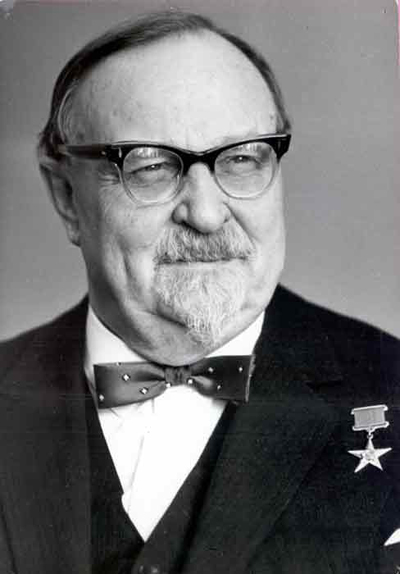
- Oparin in the mid-1970s
- Born: 2 March 1894; Uglich, Yaroslavl Governorate, Russian Empire
- Died: 21 April 1980 (aged 86); Moscow, Russian SFSR, Soviet Union
- Education: Moscow State University
- Known for: Contributions to the theory of the origin of life Coacervates
- Awards: Hero of Socialist Labour (1969); Lenin Prize (1974); Kalinga Prize (1976); Lomonosov Gold Medal (1979)
- Scientific career
- Fields: Biochemistry
- Workplaces: Moscow State University; USSR Academy of Sciences

Alexander Ivanovich Oparin (Russian: Александр Иванович Опарин; 2 March [O.S. 18 February] 1894 – 21 April 1980) was a Soviet biochemist notable for his theories about the origin of life and for his book The Origin of Life.

He also studied the biochemistry of material processing by plants and enzyme reactions in plant cells. He showed that many food production processes were based on biocatalysis and developed the foundations for industrial biochemistry in the USSR.

== Life ==
Oparin was born in Uglich in 1894 into a merchant family. He and his parents soon moved to Kokayevo, a nearby village. Oparin had an older brother, Dmitry, who became an economist.

Oparin graduated from the Moscow State University in 1917 and became a professor of biochemistry there in 1927. Many of his early papers were about plant enzymes and their role in metabolism. His first experimental studies were devoted to the chemistry of respiration. In them, he showed that chlorogenic acid is an essential component of redox reactions in the cell. In 1924 he put forward a hypothesis suggesting that life on Earth developed through a gradual chemical evolution of carbon-based molecules in the Earth's primordial soup. In 1935, along with academician Aleksei Bach, he founded the Biochemistry Institute of the Soviet Academy of Sciences. In 1939, Oparin became a Corresponding Member of the Academy, and, in 1946, a full member. In 1937, he organized the Department of Technical Biochemistry at the Moscow Technological Institute of Food Industry.

In 1940s and 1950s, Oparin supported the theories of Trofim Lysenko and Olga Lepeshinskaya, who made claims about "the origin of cells from noncellular matter". "Taking the party line" helped advance his career. However, according to cytologist Vladimir Alexandrov:

... Oparin at the very end of 1955 continued to zealously defend the pseudoscience of not only Lysenko, but also Lepeshinskaya, despite the fact that by this time many articles had already been published exposing their data, and despite the fact that there was no longer any reason to fear reprisals for defending the truths of real science.

From 1942 to 1960, Oparin headed the Department of Plant Biochemistry at Moscow State University, where he gave lectures on general biochemistry, technical biochemistry, and special courses on enzymology and the problem of the origin of life. In 1970, he was elected President of the International Society for the Study of the Origins of Life.

Oparin was one of the academicians of the USSR Academy of Sciences who signed a letter from scientists to the newspaper Pravda in 1973 condemning "the behavior of Academician A.D. Sakharov." The letter accused Sakharov of having "made a number of statements discrediting the political system, foreign and domestic policies of the Soviet Union," and the academics assessed his human rights activities as "discrediting the honor and dignity of the Soviet scientist."

Oparin died in Moscow on 21 April 1980, and was interred in Novodevichy Cemetery in Moscow.

Oparin became Hero of Socialist Labour in 1969, received the Lenin Prize in 1974, and was awarded the Lomonosov Gold Medal in 1979 "for outstanding achievements in biochemistry". He was also a five-time recipient of the Order of Lenin.

== Theory of the origin of life ==
Although Oparin's started out reviewing various panspermia theories, including those of Hermann von Helmholtz and William Thomson (Lord Kelvin), he was primarily interested in how life began. As early as 1922, he asserted that:

1. There is no fundamental difference between a living organism and lifeless matter. The complex combination of manifestations and properties characteristic of life must have arisen as a part of the process of the evolution of matter.
2. Taking into account the recent discovery of methane in the atmospheres of Jupiter and the other giant planets, Oparin suggested that the infant Earth had possessed a strongly reducing atmosphere, containing methane, ammonia, hydrogen and water vapor. In his opinion, these were the raw materials for the evolution of life.
3. In Oparin's formulation, there were first only simple solutions of organic matter, the behavior of which was governed by the properties of their component atoms and the arrangement of these atoms into a molecular structure. Gradually though, he said, the resulting growth and increased complexity of molecules brought new properties into being and a new colloidal-chemical order developed as a successor to more simple relationships between and among organic chemicals. These newer properties were determined by the interactions of these more complex molecules.
4. Oparin posited that this process brought biological orderliness into prominence. According to Oparin, competition, speed of cell growth, survival of the fittest, struggle for existence and, finally, natural selection determined the form of material organization characteristic of modern-day living things.

Oparin outlined a way he thought that basic organic chemicals might have formed into microscopic localized systems, from which primitive living things could have developed. He cited work done by de Jong and Sidney W. Fox on coacervates and research by others, including himself, into organic chemicals which, in solution, might spontaneously form droplets and layers. Oparin suggested that different types of coacervates could have formed in the Earth's primordial ocean and been subject to a selection process that led, eventually, to life.

While Oparin himself was unable to conduct experiments to test any of these ideas, later researchers tried. In 1953, Stanley Miller attempted an experiment to investigate whether chemical self-organization could have been possible on pre-historic Earth. The Miller–Urey experiment introduced heat (to provide reflux) and electrical energy (sparks, to simulate lightning) into a mixture of several simple components that would be present in a reducing atmosphere. Within a fairly short period of time a variety of familiar organic compounds, such as amino acids, were synthesised. The compounds that formed were somewhat more complex than the molecules present at the beginning of the experiment.

=== The influence of dialectical materialism on Oparin's theory ===
The Communist Party's official interpretation of Marxism, dialectical materialism, fit Oparin's speculation on the origins of life as 'a flow, an exchange, a dialectical unity'. This notion was re-enforced by Oparin's association with Lysenko.

== Major works ==
- Oparin, A. I. Proiskhozhdenie zhizni. Moscow: Izd. Moskovskii Rabochii, 1924. (in Russian)
  - English translations:
    - Oparin, A. I. "The origin of life", translation by Ann Synge. In: Bernal, J. D. (ed.), The origin of life, Weidenfeld & Nicolson, London, 1967, p. 199–234. Google, Valencia University.
    - Oparin, A. I. The Origin and Development of Life (NASA TTF-488). Washington: D.C.L GPO, 1968.
- Oparin, A. I. Vozniknovenie zhizni na zemle. Moscow: Izd. Akad. Nauk SSSR, 1936.
  - English translations:
    - Oparin, A. I. The Origin of Life, 1st ed., New York: Macmillan, 1938.
    - Oparin, A. I. The Origin of Life, 2nd ed., New York: Dover, 1953, reprinted in 2003, Google.
    - Oparin, A. I. The Origin of Life on the Earth, 3rd ed., New York: Academic Press, 1957, BHL
- Oparin, A., Fesenkov, V. Life in the Universe. Moscow: USSR Academy of Sciences publisher, 3rd edition, 1956. (in Russian)
  - English translation: Oparin, A., and V. Fesenkov. Life in the Universe. New York: Twayne Publishers (1961).
- "The External Factors in Enzyme Interactions Within a Plant Cell"
- "Life, Its Nature, Origin and Evolution"
- "The History of the Theory of Genesis and Evolution of Life"

== See also ==
- Abiogenesis
- Biochemistry
- List of independent discoveries ("Primordial soup" theory of the origin of life from carbon-based molecules, 1924)
- Microsphere
- Oparin Medal
- Proteinoid
- Sidney W. Fox
- Stanley Miller
