= Coacervate =

Aqueous phase rich in macromolecules

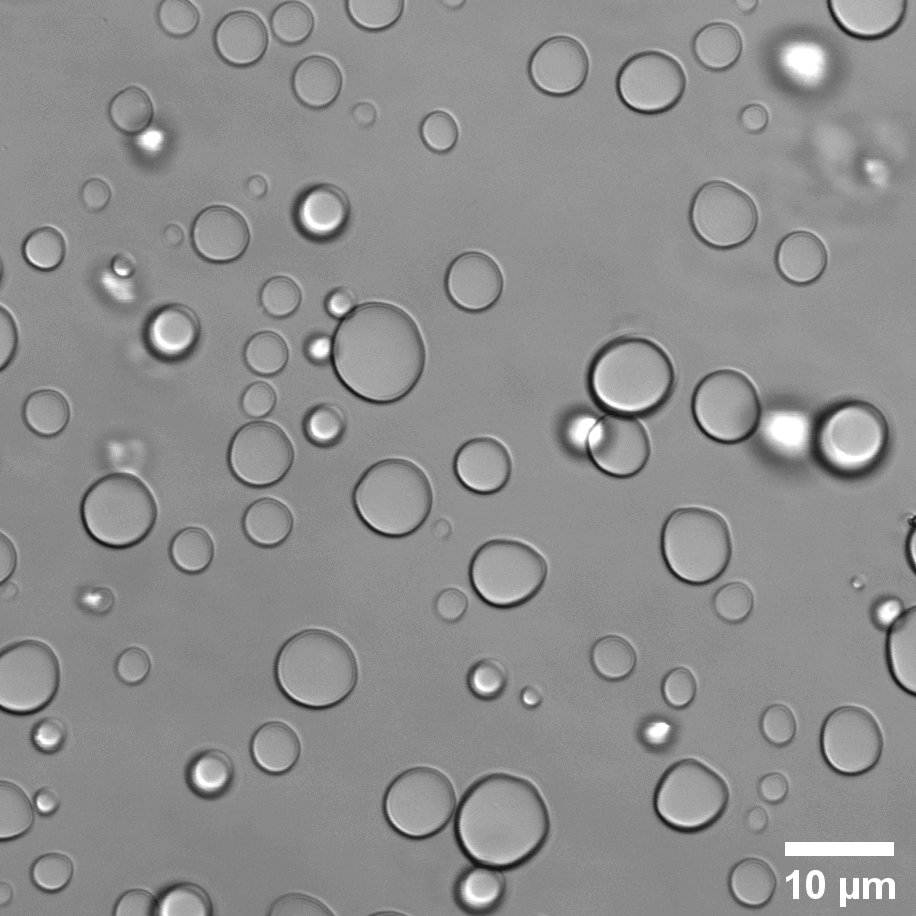
Coacervate droplets dispersed in a dilute phase

Coacervate (/koʊəˈsɜːrvət/ or /koʊˈæsərveɪt/) is an aqueous phase rich in macromolecules such as synthetic polymers, proteins or nucleic acids. It forms through liquid-liquid phase separation (LLPS), leading to a dense phase in thermodynamic equilibrium with a dilute phase. The dispersed droplets of dense phase are also called coacervates, micro-coacervates or coacervate droplets. These structures draw a lot of interest because they form spontaneously from aqueous mixtures and provide stable compartmentalization without the need of a membrane—they are protocell candidates.

The term coacervate, from Latin acervare "to heap up", was coined in 1929 by Dutch chemist Hendrik G. Bungenberg de Jong and Hugo R. Kruyt while studying lyophilic colloidal dispersions. The name is a reference to the clustering of colloidal particles, like bees in a swarm. The concept was later borrowed by Russian biologist Alexander I. Oparin to describe the proteinoid microspheres proposed to be primitive cells (protocells) on early Earth. Coacervate-like protocells are at the core of the Oparin-Haldane hypothesis.

A reawakening of coacervate research was seen in the 2000s, starting with the recognition in 2004 by scientists at the University of California, Santa Barbara (UCSB) that some marine invertebrates (such as the sandcastle worm) exploit complex coacervation to produce water-resistant biological adhesives. A few years later in 2009 the role of liquid-liquid phase separation was further recognized to be involved in the formation of certain membrane-less organelles by the biophysicists Clifford Brangwynne and Tony Hyman. Liquid organelles share features with coacervate droplets and fueled the study of coacervates for biomimicry.

== Thermodynamics ==
Coacervates are a type of lyophilic colloid; that is, the dense phase retains some of the original solvent – generally water – and does not collapse into solid aggregates, rather keeping a liquid property. Coacervates can be characterized as complex or simple based on the driving force for the LLPS: associative or segregative. Associative LLPS is dominated by attractive interactions between macromolecules (such as electrostatic force between oppositely charged polymers), and segregative LLPS is driven by the minimization of repulsive interactions (such as hydrophobic effect on proteins containing a disordered region).

The thermodynamics of segregative LLPS can be described by a Flory-Huggins polymer mixing model (see equation). In ideal polymer solutions, the free-energy of mixing ($\Delta_\mathrm{mix}G \equiv \Delta_\mathrm{mix}H - T \Delta_\mathrm{mix}S$) is negative because the mixing entropy ($\Delta_\mathrm{mix}S$, combinatorial in the Flory-Huggins approach) is positive and the interaction enthalpies are all taken as equivalent ($\Delta_{\mathrm{mix}}H = 0$ or $\chi = 0$). In non-ideal solutions, $\Delta_\mathrm{mix}H$ can be different from zero, and the process endothermic enough to overcome the entropic term and favor the de-mixed state (the blue curve shifts up). Low molecular-weight solutes will hardly reach such non-ideality, whereas for polymeric solutes, with increasing interactions sites $N$ and therefore decreasing entropic contribution, simple coacervation is much more likely.

$\Delta_{\operatorname{mix}} G=\frac{\phi}{N} \ln \phi+(1-\phi) \ln (1-\phi)+\Delta_{\operatorname{mix}} H$

$\Delta_{\operatorname{mix}} G=k_{B} T\left[\frac{\phi}{N} \ln \phi+(1-\phi) \ln (1-\phi)\right]+\Delta_{\operatorname{mix}} H$

$\Delta_{\operatorname{mix}} H =\chi \phi(1-\phi)$

The phase diagram of the mixture can be predicted by experimentally determining the two-phase boundary, or binodal curve. In a simplistic theoretical approach, the binodes are the compositions at which the free energy of de-mixing is minimal ($\frac{\partial \Delta_{\operatorname{mix}} G}{\partial x}=0$

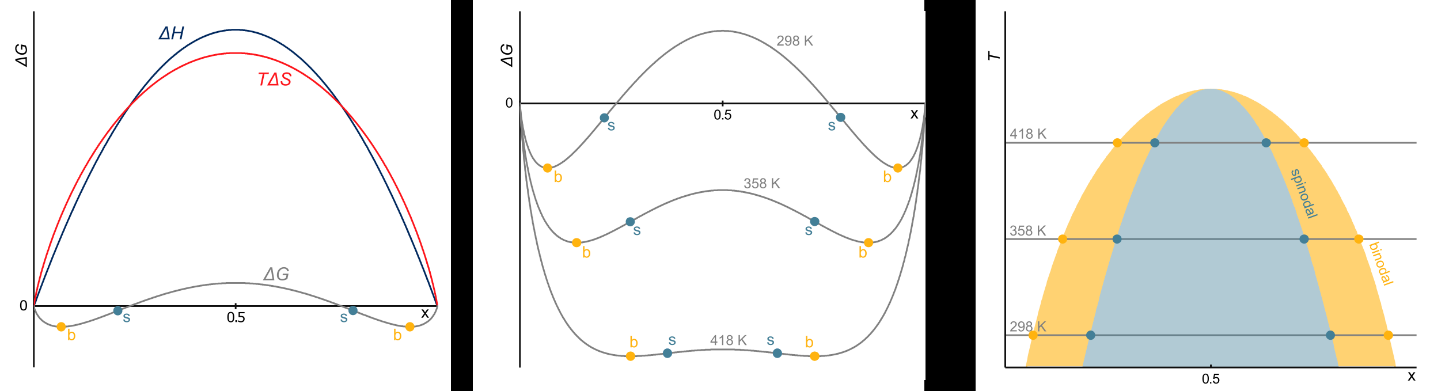
Free energy of de-mixing according to Flory-Huggins approach. By determining the free-energy curve for different temperatures and taking the critical points, the phase diagram on the right can be constructed.

), across different temperatures (or other interaction parameter). Alternatively, by minimizing the change in free energy of de-mixing in regards to composition ($\frac{\partial^{2} \Delta_{\operatorname{mix}} G}{\partial x^{2}}=0$), the spinodal curve is defined. The conditions of the mixture in comparison to the two curves defines the phase separation mechanism: nucleation-growth of coacervate droplets (when the binodal region is crossed slowly) and spinodal decomposition.

Associative LLPS is more complex to describe, as both solute polymers are present in the dilute and dense phase. Electrostatic-based complex coacervates are the most common, and in that case the solutes are two polyelectrolytes of opposite charge. The Voorn-Overbeek approach applies the Debye-Hückel approximation for simple electrolytes to the enthalpic term in the Flory-Huggins model, and considers two polyelectrolytes of the same length and at the same concentration. Kudlay and Olvera de la Cruz, included the chain connectivity and an effective excluded volume in the model, and found that the density of the precipitate after initial decrease can increase with the addition of salt as a result of the redistribution of salt between the precipitate and the supernatant, which is due to an interplay of electrostatic and hardcore interactions. Complex coacervates are a subset of aqueous two-phase systems (ATPS), including segregatively separated systems in which both phases are enriched in one type of polymer.

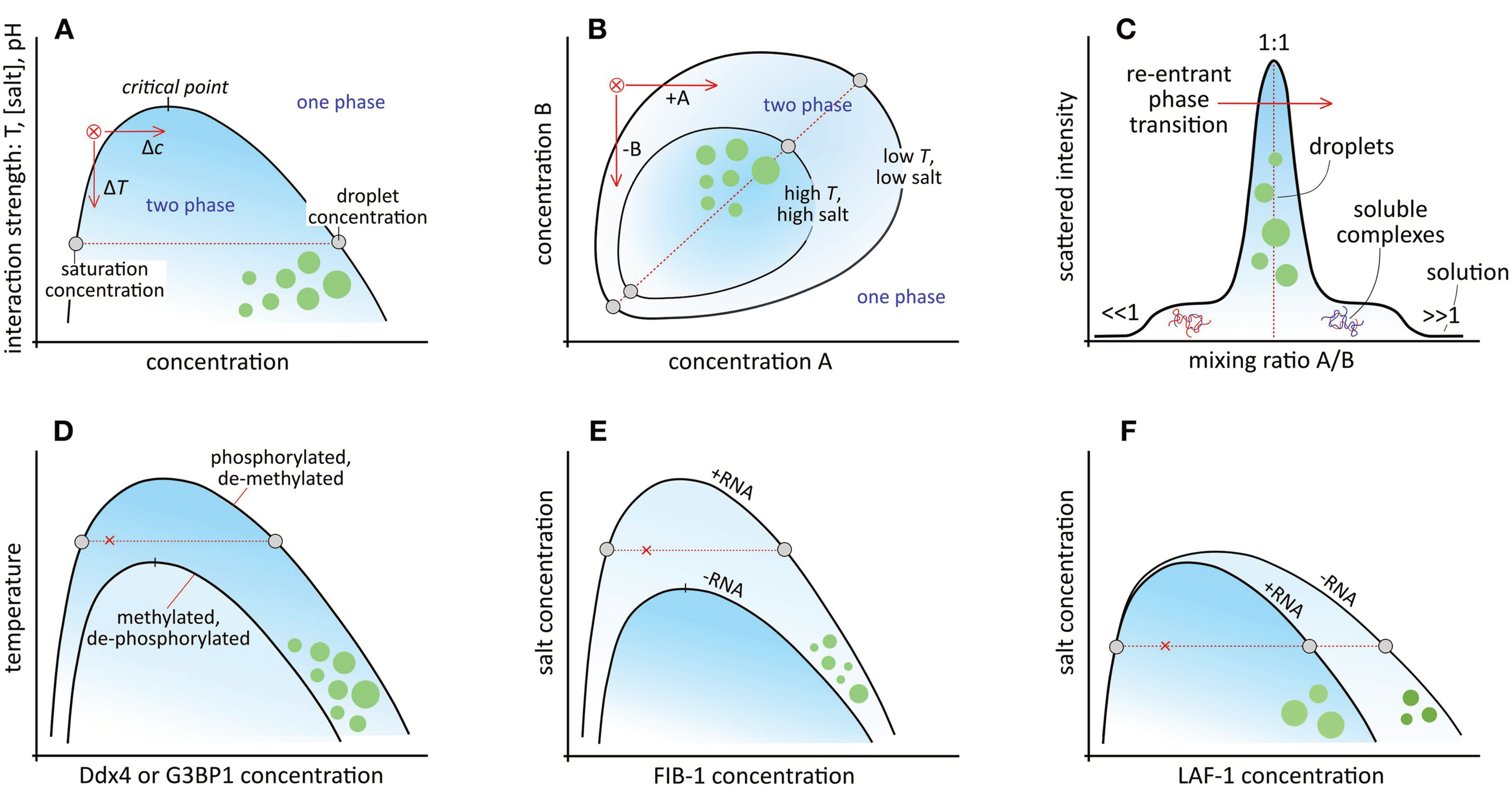
Phase diagrams for coacervation

== Coacervates in biology ==
Membrane-less organelles (MLOs), also known as biomolecular condensates, are a form of cell compartmentalization. Unlike classic membrane-bound organelles such as mitochondria, cell nuclei or lysosomes, MLOs are not separated from their surroundings by a lipid bilayer. MLOs are mostly composed of proteins and nucleic acids, held together by weak intermolecular forces.

MLOs are present in the cytoplasm as stress granules, processing bodies (P-bodies), and in the nucleus including the nucleolus, and nuclear speckles. They have been shown to serve various functions: they can store and protect cellular material during stress conditions, they participate in gene expression and they are involved in the control of signal transduction.

It is now widely believed that MLOs form through LLPS. This was first proposed after observing that Cajal bodies and P granules show liquid-like properties, and was later confirmed by showing that liquid condensates can be reconstituted from purified protein and RNA in vitro. However, whether MLOs should be referred to as liquids, remains disputable. Even if initially they are liquid-like, over time some of them maturate into solids (gel-like or even crystalline, depending on the extent of spatial ordering within the condensate).

Many proteins participating in the formation of MLO contain so-called intrinsically disordered regions (IDRs), parts of the polypeptide chain that can adopt multiple secondary structures and form random coils in solution. IDRs can provide interactions responsible for LLPS, but over time conformational changes (sometimes promoted by mutations or post-translational modifications) may lead to the formation of higher ordered structures and solidification of MLOs. Some MLOs serve their biological role as solid particles (e.g. Balbiani body stabilised by β-sheet structure), but in many cases transformation from liquid to solid results in the formation of pathological aggregates. Examples of both liquid-liquid phase separating and aggregation-prone proteins include FUS, TDP-43 and hnRNPA1. Aggregates of these proteins are associated with neurodegenerative diseases (e.g. amyotrophic lateral sclerosis, or frontotemporal dementia).

== History ==
At the start of the 20th century, scientists had become interested in the stability of colloids, both the dispersions of solid particles and the solutions of polymeric molecules. It was known that salts and temperature could often be used to cause flocculation of a colloid. The German chemist F.W. Tiebackx reported in 1911 that flocculation could also be induced in certain polymer solutions by mixing them together. In particular, he reported the observation of opalescence (a turbid mixture) when equal volumes of acidified 0.5% "washed" gelatine solution, and 2% gum arabic solution were mixed. Tiebackx did not further analyse the nature of the flocs, but it is likely that this was an example of complex coacervation.

Dutch chemist H. G. Bungenberg-de Jong reported in his PhD thesis (Utrecht, 1921) two types of flocculation in agar solutions: one that leads to a suspensoid state, and one that leads to an emulsoid state. He observed the emulsoid state under the microscope and described small particles that merged into larger particles (Thesis, p. 82), most likely a description of coalescing coacervate droplets. Several years later, in 1929, Bungenberg-de Jong published a seminal paper with his PhD advisor, H. R. Kruyt, entitled “Coacervation. Partial miscibility in colloid systems”. In their paper, they give many more examples of colloid systems that flocculate into an emulsoid state, either by varying the temperature, by adding salts, co-solvents or by mixing together two oppositely charged polymer colloids, and illustrate their observations with the first microscope pictures of coacervate droplets. They term this phenomenon coacervation, derived from the prefix co and the Latin word acervus (heap), which relates to the dense liquid droplets. Coacervation is thus loosely translated as 'to come together in a heap'. Since then, Bungenberg-de Jong and his research group in Leiden published a range of papers on coacervates, including results on self-coacervation, salt effects, interfacial tension, multiphase coacervates and surfactant-based coacervates.

In the meantime, Russian chemist Alexander Oparin, published a pioneering work in which he laid out his protocell theory on the origin of life. In his initial protocell model, Oparin took inspiration from Graham's description of colloids from 1861 as substances that usually give cloudy solutions and cannot pass through membranes. Oparin linked these properties to the protoplasm, and reasoned that precipitates of colloids form as clots or lumps of mucus or jelly, some of which have structural features that resemble the protoplasm. According to Oparin, protocells could therefore have formed by precipitation of colloids. In his later work, Oparin became more specific about his protocell model. He described the work of Bungenberg-de Jong on coacervates in his book from 1938, and postulated that the first protocells were coacervates.

Other researchers followed, and in the 1930s and 1940s various examples of coacervation were reported, by Bungenberg-de Jong, Oparin, Koets, Bank, Langmuir and others. In the 1950s and 1960s, focus shifted to a theoretical description of the phenomenon of (complex) coacervation. Voorn and Overbeek developed the first mean-field theory to describe coacervation. They estimated the total free energy of mixing as a sum of mixing entropy terms and mean-field electrostatic interactions in a Debye-Hückel approximation. Veis and Aranyi suggested to extend this model with an electrostatic aggregation step in which charge-paired symmetrical soluble aggregates are formed, followed by phase separation into liquid droplets.

In the decades after that, until about 2000, the scientific interest in coacervates had faded. Oparin's theory on the role of coacervates in the origin of life had been replaced by interest in the RNA world hypothesis. Renewed interest in coacervates originated as scientists recognized the relevance and versatility of the interactions that underlie complex coacervation in the natural fabrication of biological materials and in their self-assembly.

Since 2009, coacervates have become linked to membraneless organelles and there has been a renewed interest in coacervates as protocells.

== Coacervates hypothesis for the origin of life ==
Russian biochemist Aleksander Oparin and British biologist J.B.S. Haldane independently hypothesized in the 1920s that the first cells in early Earth's oceans could be, in essence, coacervate droplets. Haldane used the term primordial soup to refer to the dilute mixture of organic molecules that could have built up as a result of reactions between inorganic building blocks such as ammonia, carbon dioxide and water, in presence of UV light as an energy source. Oparin proposed that simple building blocks with increasing complexity could organize locally, or self-assemble, to form protocells with living properties. He performed experiments based on Bungenberg de Jong's colloidal aggregates (coacervates) to encapsulate proteinoids and enzymes within protocells. Work by chemists Sidney Fox, Kaoru Harada, Stanley Miller and Harold Urey further strengthened the theory that inorganic building blocks could increase in complexity and give rise to cell-like structures.

The Oparin-Haldane hypothesis established the foundations of research on the chemistry of abiogenesis, but the lipid-world and RNA-world scenarios have gained more attention since the 1980s with the work of Morowitz, Luisi and Szostak. However, recently, there has been a rising interest in coacervates as protocells, resonating with current findings that reactions too slow or unlikely in aqueous solutions can be significantly favored in such membraneless compartments.

== See also ==
- Protocell
- Artificial cell
