= Microparticle =

Spherical particle larger than nano particles but smaller than sand particles

IUPAC definition

Particle with dimensions between 1 × 10^{−7} and 1 × 10^{−4} m.

Note 1: The lower limit between micro- and nano-sizing is still a matter of debate.

Note 2: To be consistent with the prefix “micro” and the range imposed by the definition,
dimensions of microparticles should be expressed in μm.

Microparticles are particles between 0.1 and 100 μm in size. Commercially available microparticles are available in a wide variety of materials, including ceramics, glass, polymers, and metals. Microparticles encountered in daily life include pollen, sand, dust, flour, and powdered sugar. The study of microparticles has been called micromeritics, although this term is not very common.

Microparticles have a much larger surface-to-volume ratio than at the macroscale, and thus their behavior can be quite different. For example, metal microparticles can be explosive in air.

Microspheres are spherical microparticles, and are used where consistent and predictable particle surface area is important.

In biological systems, a microparticle is synonymous with a microvesicle, a type of extracellular vesicle (EV).

== Applications ==
Home pregnancy tests make use of gold microparticles. Many applications are also listed in the microsphere article.

A recent study showed that infused, negatively charged, immune-modifying microparticles could have therapeutic use in diseases caused or potentiated by inflammatory monocytes.

Microparticles can also be used during minimally invasive embolization procedures, such as hemorrhoidal artery embolization.

== Microspheres ==
Microspheres are small spherical particles, with diameters in the micrometer range (typically 1 μm to 1000 μm (1 mm). Microspheres are sometimes referred to as spherical microparticles. In general microspheres are solid or hollow and do not have a fluid inside, as opposed to microcapsules.

Microspheres can be made from various natural and synthetic materials. Glass microspheres, polymer microspheres, metal microspheres, and ceramic microspheres are commercially available. Solid and hollow microspheres vary widely in density and, therefore, are used for different applications. Hollow microspheres are typically used as additives to lower the density of a material. Solid microspheres have numerous applications depending on what material they are constructed of and what size they are.

Polyethylene, polystyrene and expandable microspheres are the most common types of polymer microspheres.

IUPAC definition

Microparticle of spherical shape without membrane or any distinct outer layer.

Note: The absence of outer layer forming a distinct phase is important to distinguish
microspheres from microcapsules because it leads to first-order diffusion phenomena,
whereas diffusion is zero order in the case of microcapsules.

Polystyrene microspheres are typically used in biomedical applications due to their ability to facilitate procedures such as cell sorting and immunoprecipitation. Proteins and ligands adsorb onto polystyrene readily and permanently, which makes polystyrene microspheres suitable for medical research and biological laboratory experiments.

Polyethylene microspheres are commonly used as a permanent or temporary filler. Lower melting temperature enables polyethylene microspheres to create porous structures in ceramics and other materials. High sphericity of polyethylene microspheres, as well as availability of colored and fluorescent microspheres, makes them highly desirable for flow visualization and fluid flow analysis, microscopy techniques, health sciences, process troubleshooting and numerous research applications. Charged polyethylene microspheres are also used in electronic paper digital displays.

Expandable microspheres are polymer microspheres that are used as a blowing agent in e.g. puff ink, automotive underbody coatings and injection molding of thermoplastics. They can also be used as a lightweight filler in e.g. cultured marble, waterborne paints and crack fillers/joint compound. Expandable polymer microspheres can expand to more than 50 times their original size when heat is applied to them. The exterior wall of each sphere is a thermoplastic shell that encapsulates a low boiling point hydrocarbon. When heated, this outside shell softens and expands as the hydrocarbon exerts a pressure on the internal shell wall.

Glass microspheres are primarily used as a filler and volumizer for weight reduction, retro-reflector for highway safety, additive for cosmetics and adhesives, with limited applications in medical technology.

Microspheres made from highly transparent glass can perform as very high quality optical microcavities or optical microresonators.

Ceramic microspheres are used primarily as grinding media.

Hollow microspheres loaded with drug in their outer polymer shell were prepared by a novel emulsion solvent diffusion method and spray drying technique.

Microspheres vary widely in quality, sphericity, uniformity, particle size and particle size distribution. The appropriate microsphere needs to be chosen for each unique application.

== Applications ==
New applications for microspheres are discovered every day. Below are just a few:

- Assay - Coated microspheres provide measuring tool in biology and drug research
- Buoyancy - Hollow microspheres are used to decrease material density in plastics (glass and polymer), neutrally-buoyant microspheres are frequently used for fluid flow visualization.
- Particle image velocimetry - Solid or hollow microspheres used for flow visualization, density of the particle has to match that of the fluid.
- Ceramics - Used to create porous ceramics used for filters (microspheres melt out during firing, Polyethylene Microspheres) or used to prepare high strength lightweight concrete.
- Cosmetics - Opaque microspheres used to hide wrinkles and give color, Clear microspheres provide "smooth ball bearing" texture during application (Polyethylene Microspheres)
- Deconvolution - Small fluorescent microspheres (<200 nanometers) are required to obtain an experimental Point spread function to characterise microscopes and perform image deconvolution
- Drug delivery - As miniature time release drug capsule made of, for example, polymers. A similar use is as outer shells of microbubble contrast agents used in contrast-enhanced ultrasound.
- Electronic paper - Dual Functional microspheres used in Gyricon electronic paper
- Insulation – expandable polymer microspheres are used for thermal insulation and sound dampening.
- Personal Care - Added to Scrubs as an exfoliating agent (Polyethylene Microspheres)
- Spacers - Used in LCD screens to provide a precision spacing between glass panels (glass)
- Standards - monodisperse microspheres are used to calibrate particle sieves, and particle counting apparatus.
- Retroreflective - added on top of paint used on roads and signs to increase night visibility of road stripes and signs (glass)
- Thickening Agent - Added to paints and epoxies to modify viscosity and buoyancy
- Drugs can be formulated as HBS floating microsphere. Following are list of drugs which can formulated as microsphere: Repaglinide, Cimetidine, Rosiglitazone, Nitrendipine, Acyclovir, Ranitidine HCl, Misoprostol, Metformin, Aceclofenac, Diltiazem, L-Dopa and benserazide, Fluorouracil.

== Biological protocells ==
Some refer to microspheres or protein protocells as small spherical units postulated by some scientists as a key stage in the origin of life.

In 1953, Stanley Miller and Harold Urey demonstrated that many simple biomolecules could be formed spontaneously from inorganic precursor compounds under laboratory conditions designed to mimic those found on Earth before the evolution of life. Of particular interest was the substantial yield of amino acids obtained, since amino acids are the building blocks for proteins.

In 1957, Sidney Fox demonstrated that dry mixtures of amino acids could be encouraged to polymerize upon exposure to moderate heat. When the resulting polypeptides, or proteinoids, were dissolved in hot water and the solution allowed to cool, they formed small spherical shells about 2 μm in diameter—microspheres. Under appropriate conditions, microspheres will bud new spheres at their surfaces.

Although roughly cellular in appearance, microspheres in and of themselves are not alive. Although they do reproduce asexually by budding, they do not pass on any type of genetic material. However they may have been important in the development of life, providing a membrane-enclosed volume which is similar to that of a cell. Microspheres, like cells, can grow and contain a double membrane which undergoes diffusion of materials and osmosis. Sidney Fox postulated that as these microspheres became more complex, they would carry on more lifelike functions. They would become heterotrophs, organisms with the ability to absorb nutrients from the environment for energy and growth. As the amount of nutrients in the environment decreased at that period, competition for those precious resources increased. Heterotrophs with more complex biochemical reactions would have an advantage in this competition. Over time, organisms would evolve that used photosynthesis to produce energy.

== Cancer research ==
One useful discovery made from the research of microspheres is a way to fight cancer on a molecular level. According to Wake Oncologists, SIR-Spheres microspheres are radioactive polymer spheres that emit beta radiation. Physicians insert a catheter through the groin into the hepatic artery and deliver millions of microspheres directly to the tumor site. The SIR-Spheres microspheres target the liver tumors and spare healthy liver tissue. Cancer microsphere technology is the latest trend in cancer therapy. It helps the pharmacist to formulate the product with maximum therapeutic value and minimum or negligible range side effects. A major disadvantage of anticancer drugs is their lack of selectivity for tumor tissue alone, which causes severe side effects and results in low cure rates. Thus, it is very difficult to target abnormal cells by the conventional method of the drug delivery system. Microsphere technology is probably the only method that can be used for site-specific action (grossly overstated), without causing significant side effects on normal cells.

== Extracellular vesicles ==
Microparticles can be released as extracellular microvesicles from red blood cells, white blood cells, platelets, or endothelial cells. These biological microparticles are thought to be shed from the plasma membrane of the cell as lipid bilayer-bound entities that are typically larger than 100 nm in diameter. "Microparticle" has been used most frequently in this sense in the hemostasis literature, usually as a term for platelet EVs found in the blood circulation. Because EVs retain the signature membrane protein composition of the parent cell, MPs and other EVs may carry useful information including biomarkers of disease. They can be detected and characterized by methods such as flow cytometry, or dynamic light scattering.

== See also ==
- Coacervate
- Luminescent
- Proteinoid
- Micro-encapsulation
- Microbeads
- Nanoparticle
