= Pauthenier equation =

The Pauthenier equation states that the maximum charge accumulated by a particle modelled by a small sphere passing through an electric field is given by:

$Q_{\mathrm{max}}=4\pi R^2\epsilon_0pE$

where $\epsilon_0$ is the permittivity of free space, $R$ is the radius of the sphere, $E$ is the electric field strength, and $p$ is a material dependent constant.

For conductors, $p=3$.

For dielectrics: $p = 3\epsilon_r/(\epsilon_r + 2)$ where $\epsilon_r$ is the relative permittivity.

Low charges on nanoparticles and microparticles are stable over more than 10^{3} second time scales.
