= Primordial soup =

Theoretical conditions under which life on the Earth might have begun

Primordial soup, also known as prebiotic soup and Haldane soup, is the hypothetical set of conditions present on the Earth around 3.7 to 4.0 billion years ago. It is an aspect of the heterotrophic theory (also known as the Oparin–Haldane hypothesis) concerning the origin of life, first proposed by Alexander Oparin in 1924, and J. B. S. Haldane in 1929.

As formulated by Oparin, in the primitive Earth's surface layers, carbon, hydrogen, water vapour, and ammonia, reacted to form the first organic compounds. The concept of a primordial soup gained credence in 1953 when the Miller–Urey experiment used a highly reduced mixture of gases—methane, ammonia and hydrogen—to form basic organic monomers, such as amino acids.

== Historical background ==
The notion that living beings originated from inanimate materials comes from the Ancient Greeks—the theory known as spontaneous generation. Aristotle in the 4th century BCE gave a proper explanation, writing:

So with animals, some spring from parent animals according to their kind, whilst others grow spontaneously and not from kindred stock; and of these instances of spontaneous generation some come from putrefying earth or vegetable matter, as is the case with a number of insects, while others are spontaneously generated in the inside of animals out of the secretions of their several organs.

— Aristotle, On the History of Animals, Book V, Part 1

Aristotle also states that it is not only that animals originate from other similar animals, but also that living things do arise and always have arisen from lifeless matter. His theory remained the dominant idea on origin of life (outside that of deity as a causal agent) from the ancient philosophers to the Renaissance thinkers in various forms. With the birth of modern science, experimental refutations emerged. Italian physician Francesco Redi demonstrated in 1668 that maggots developed from rotten meat only in a jar where flies could enter, but not in a closed-lid jar. He concluded that: omne vivum ex vivo (All life comes from life).

The experiment of French chemist Louis Pasteur in 1859 is regarded as the death blow to spontaneous generation. He experimentally showed that organisms (microbes) can not grow in sterilised water, unless it is exposed to air. The experiment won him the Alhumbert Prize in 1862 from the French Academy of Sciences, and he concluded: "Never will the doctrine of spontaneous generation recover from the mortal blow of this simple experiment."

Evolutionary biologists believed that a kind of spontaneous generation, but different from the simple Aristotelian doctrine, must have worked for the emergence of life. French biologist Jean-Baptiste de Lamarck had speculated that the first life form started from non-living materials. "Nature, by means of heat, light, electricity and moisture", he wrote in 1809 in Philosophie Zoologique (The Philosophy of Zoology), "forms direct or spontaneous generation at that extremity of each kingdom of living bodies, where the simplest of these bodies are found".

When English naturalist Charles Darwin introduced the theory of natural selection in his 1859 book On the Origin of Species, his supporters, such as the German zoologist Ernst Haeckel, criticised him for not using his theory to explain the origin of life. Haeckel wrote in 1862: "The chief defect of the Darwinian theory is that it throws no light on the origin of the primitive organism—probably a simple cell—from which all the others have descended. When Darwin assumes a special creative act for this first species, he is not consistent, and, I think, not quite sincere."

Although Darwin did not speak explicitly about the origin of life in On the Origin of Species, he did mention a "warm little pond" in a letter to Joseph Dalton Hooker dated February 1, 1871:

It is often said that all the conditions for the first production of a living being are now present, which could ever have been present. But if (and oh what a big if) we could conceive in some warm little pond with all sort of ammonia and phosphoric salts,—light, heat, electricity present, that a protein compound was chemically formed, ready to undergo still more complex changes, at the present such matter would be instantly devoured, or absorbed, which would not have been the case before living creatures were formed [...].

— Charles Darwin, Letter to Joseph Dalton Hooker on February 1, 1871

=== Heterotrophic theory ===
A coherent scientific argument was introduced by Soviet biochemist Alexander Oparin in 1924. According to Oparin, in the primitive Earth's surface, carbon, hydrogen, water vapour, and ammonia reacted to form the first organic compounds. Unbeknownst to Oparin, whose writing was circulated only in Russian, an English scientist J. B. S. Haldane independently arrived at a similar conclusion in 1929. It was Haldane who first used the term "soup" to describe the accumulation of organic material and water in the primitive Earth:

When ultra-violet light acts on a mixture of water, carbon dioxide, and ammonia, a vast variety of organic substances are made, including sugars and apparently some of the materials from which proteins are built up. [...] before the origin of life they must have accumulated till the primitive oceans reached the consistency of hot dilute soup.

— J. B. S. Haldane, The Origin of Life

According to the theory, organic compounds essential for life forms were synthesized in the primitive Earth under prebiotic conditions. The mixture of inorganic and organic compounds with water on the primitive Earth became the prebiotic or primordial soup. There, life originated and the first forms of life were able to use the organic molecules to survive and reproduce. Today the theory is variously known as the heterotrophic theory, heterotrophic origin of life theory, or the Oparin-Haldane hypothesis. Biochemist Robert Shapiro has summarized the basic points of the theory in its "mature form" as follows:

1. Early Earth had a chemically reducing atmosphere.
2. This atmosphere, exposed to energy in various forms, produced simple organic compounds ("monomers").
3. These compounds accumulated in the prebiotic soup, which may have been concentrated at places such as shorelines and oceanic vents.
4. By further transformation, more complex organic polymers – and ultimately life – developed in the soup.

== Oparin's theory ==
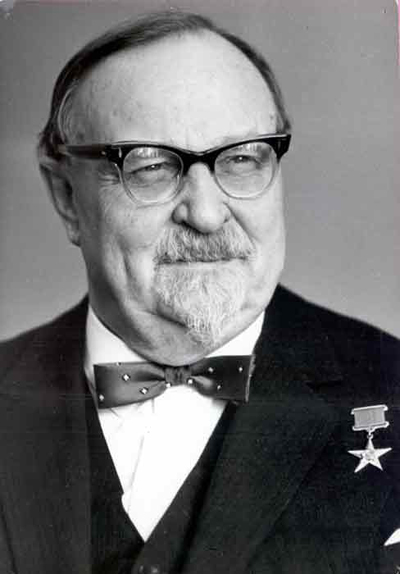
Alexander Oparin

Alexander Oparin first postulated his theory (in the Russian language) in 1924 in a small pamphlet titled Proiskhozhdenie Zhizny (The Origin of Life). According to Oparin, the primitive Earth's surface had a thick red-hot liquid, composed of heavy elements such as carbon (in the form of iron carbide). This nucleus was surrounded by the lightest elements, i.e. gases, such as hydrogen. In the presence of water vapour, carbides reacted with hydrogen to form hydrocarbons. Such hydrocarbons were the first organic molecules. These further combined with oxygen and ammonia to produce hydroxy- and amino-derivatives, such as carbohydrates and proteins. These molecules accumulated on the ocean's surface, becoming gel-like substances and growing in size. They gave rise to primitive organisms (cells), which he called coacervates. In his original theory, Oparin considered oxygen as one of the primordial gases; thus the primordial atmosphere was an oxidising one. However, when he elaborated his theory in 1936 (in a book by the same title, and translated into English in 1938), he modified the chemical composition of the primordial environment as strictly reducing, consisting of methane, ammonia, free hydrogen and water vapour—excluding oxygen.

In his 1936 work, impregnated by a Darwinian thought that involved a slow and gradual evolution from the simple to the complex, Oparin proposed a heterotrophic origin, result of a long process of chemical and pre-biological evolution, where the first forms of life should have been microorganisms dependent on the molecules and organic substances present in their external environment. That external environment was the primordial soup.

The idea of a heterotrophic origin was based, in part, on the universality of fermentative reactions, which, according to Oparin, should have first appeared in evolution due to its simplicity. This was opposed to the idea, widely accepted at that time, that the first organisms emerged endowed with an autotrophic metabolism, which included photosynthetic pigments, enzymes and the ability to synthesize organic compounds from CO_{2} and H_{2}O; for Oparin it was impossible to reconcile the original photosynthetic organisms with the ideas of Darwinian evolution.

From the detailed analysis of the geochemical and astronomical data known at that date, Oparin also proposed a primitive atmosphere devoid of O_{2} and composed of CH_{4}, NH_{3} and H_{2}O; under these conditions it was pointed out that the origin of life had been preceded by a period of abiotic synthesis and subsequent accumulation of various organic compounds in the seas of primitive Earth. This accumulation resulted in the formation of a primordial broth containing a wide variety of molecules.

There, according to Oparin, a particular type of colloid, the coacervates, were formed due to the conglomeration of organic molecules and other polymers with positive and negative charges. Oparin suggested that the first living beings had been preceded by pre-cellular structures similar to those coacervates, whose gradual evolution gave rise to the appearance of the first organisms.

Like the coacervates, several of Oparin's original ideas have been reformulated and replaced; this includes, for example, the reducing character of the atmosphere on primitive Earth, the coacervates as a pre-cellular model and the primitive nature of glycolysis. In the same way, we now understand that the gradual processes are not necessarily slow, and we even know, thanks to the fossil record, that the origin and early evolution of life occurred in short geologic time lapses.

However, the general approach of Oparin's theory had great implications for biology, since his work achieved the transformation of the study of the origin of life from a purely speculative field to a structured and broad research program. Thus, since the second half of the twentieth century, Oparin's theory of the origin and early evolution of life has undergone a restructuring that accommodates the experimental findings of molecular biology, as well as the theoretical contributions of evolutionary biology.

A point of convergence between these two branches of biology and that has been perfectly incorporated into the heterotrophic origin theory is found in the RNA world hypothesis.

This links to the Soda Ocean Hypothesis, characterizing the primitive ocean with a higher carbonate mineral supersaturation. Soda lakes are considered as environments that conserve and/or mimic ancient life conditions and as "a recreated model of late Precambrian ocean chemistry" — that is, the "soda lake" environment that prepared the great explosion of life during the Cambrian.

== Haldane's theory ==
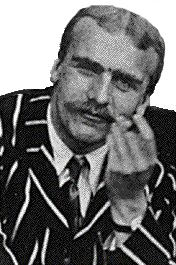
J.B.S. Haldane

J.B.S. Haldane independently postulated his primordial soup theory in 1929 in an eight-page article "The origin of life" in The Rationalist Annual. According to Haldane the primitive Earth's atmosphere was essentially reducing, with little or no oxygen. Ultraviolet rays from the Sun induced reactions on a mixture of water, carbon dioxide, and ammonia. Organic substances such as sugars and protein components (amino acids) were synthesised. These molecules "accumulated till the primitive oceans reached the consistency of hot dilute soup." The first reproducing things were created from this soup.

As to the priority over the theory, Haldane accepted that Oparin came first, saying, "I have very little doubt that Professor Oparin has the priority over me."

== Unanswered questions ==
Though Oparin and Haldane presented a convincing theory for the origin of life, there are some natural phenomena that their work fails to explain. It is understood, based on the heterotrophic theory, that at the time life was generated, the atmosphere was strongly reducing. However, evidence suggests that the atmosphere was likely not nearly reducing enough to support this. The availability of highly reduced compounds such as NH_{3} and CH_{4} was limited, there was likely not enough of them to support heterotrophic redox and life.

Another complication with the heterotrophic theory exists due to the selective chirality of biological molecules. Chirality refers to the lack of symmetry in biological molecules and which orientation they prefer. For instance, amino acids exist predominantly in the L conformation and sugars prefer the D conformation. Biological molecules are highly specific in which enantiomer they prefer. Because of this unique fact, scientists feel that the correct theory of the origin of life should explain this selective chirality. The heterotrophic theory fails to do this.

The heterotrophic theory is highly specific and includes details about the conditions of early metabolism. However, in doing this, it is unable to provide a grounds for evolution and the distinction between bacteria, archaea, and eucarya. How did organisms that utilize the same type of metabolism become so highly differentiated? This is another unanswered question we are left with if the heterotrophic theory is true.

Finally, as the name implies, the heterotrophic theory indicates that early life on earth consisted entirely of heterotrophs. A condition of heterotrophic metabolism, is that the energetic substrate is not produced by the same organism that consumes it. Because of this, heterotrophy works well in tandem with other species that replenish the depleted substrate. However, if all early life was heterotrophic, there would be no way to regenerate the metabolite needed for energy production. The heterotrophic theory fails to explain this key fallacy.

== Monomer formation ==
One of the most important pieces of experimental support for the "soup" theory came in 1953. A graduate student, Stanley Miller, and his professor, Harold Urey, performed an experiment that demonstrated how organic molecules could have spontaneously formed from inorganic precursors, under conditions like those posited by the Oparin–Haldane hypothesis. The now-famous "Miller–Urey experiment" used a highly reduced mixture of gases—methane, ammonia and hydrogen—to form basic organic monomers, such as amino acids. This provided direct experimental support for the second point of the "soup" theory, and it is one of the remaining two points of the theory that much of the debate now centers.

Apart from the Miller–Urey experiment, the next most important step in research on prebiotic organic synthesis was the demonstration by Joan Oró that the nucleic acid purine base, adenine, was formed by heating aqueous ammonium cyanide solutions. In support of abiogenesis in eutectic ice, more recent work demonstrated the formation of s-triazines (alternative nucleobases), pyrimidines (including cytosine and uracil), and adenine from urea solutions subjected to freeze-thaw cycles under a reductive atmosphere (with spark discharges as an energy source).

== The Darwinian dynamic ==
The evolution of living systems by natural selection that presumably emerged in the primordial soup, and certain nonliving physical order-generating systems, were proposed to obey a common fundamental principle that was termed the Darwinian dynamic. The basic conditions necessary for natural selection to operate as conceived by Darwin are variation of type, heritability and competition for limited resources. These conditions can apply to short replicating RNA molecules that were presumably present in the primordial soup, and such RNA molecules have been proposed to have preceded the emergence of more complex life (see RNA world). The basic processes of natural selection applicable to short replicating RNA molecules were shown to have the same form and content as equations that govern the emergence of macroscopic order in nonliving systems maintained far from thermodynamic equilibrium. However, currently, the extent to which Darwinian principles apply to the presumed prebiotic and protocellular phases of life, as well as to non-biological systems, remains an unresolved issue in efforts to understand the emergence of life.

== See also ==
- Common descent
- Entropy and life
- Primordial sandwich
- Primordial sea
