= 2-Methylserine =

Names
- IUPAC name α-methyl-serine
- Systematic IUPAC name 2-Amino-3-hydroxy-2-methylpropanoic acid

Identifiers
CAS Number	D/L: 5424-29-3; L: 16820-18-1
3D model (JSmol)	D/L: Interactive image; L: Interactive image
ChEBI	D/L: CHEBI:134206
ChEMBL	D/L: ChEMBL539702
ChemSpider	D/L: 85112
ECHA InfoCard	100.024.150
KEGG	D/L: C02115
MeSH	2-methylserine
PubChem CID	D/L: 94309; L: 7000050
UNII	D/L: CZ8HQ2F53F
CompTox Dashboard (EPA)	D/L: DTXSID001346506
- InChI: InChI=1S/C4H9NO3/c1-4(5,2-6)3(7)8/h6H,2,5H2,1H3,(H,7,8) Key: CDUUKBXTEOFITR-UHFFFAOYSA-N; L: InChI=1S/C4H9NO3/c1-4(5,2-6)3(7)8/h6H,2,5H2,1H3,(H,7,8)/t4-/m0/s1 Key: CDUUKBXTEOFITR-BYPYZUCNSA-N
- SMILES: D/L: CC(CO)(C(=O)O)N; L: C[C@](CO)(C(=O)O)N

Properties
Chemical formula	C_{4}H_{9}NO_{3}
Molar mass	119.120 g·mol^{−1}
Solubility in water	soluble

Hazards
- GHS labelling
Pictograms	(GHS07: Exclamation mark)
Signal word	Warning
Hazard statements	H315, H319, H335
Precautionary statements	P261, P264, P264+P265, P271, P280, P302+P352, P304+P340, P305+P351+P338, P319, P321, P332+P317, P337+P317, P362+P364, P403+P233, P405, P501
- Except where otherwise noted, data are given for materials in their standard state (at 25 °C [77 °F], 100 kPa). Infobox references

2-Methylserine is a non-proteinogenic amino acid that is structurally similar to serine. Like serine, it is polar, and therefore soluble in water. It differs structurally from serine by the presence of a methyl group attached to a carbon atom in the backbone.

2-Methylserine is one of the amino acids produced by an unpublished volcanic-spark discharge experiment conducted by Stanley Miller in the early 1950s. However, the presence of this and many other organic compounds was not discovered until Jeffrey Bada et al. re-analyzed the contents of the vials from Miller's experiment in 2008.
