= Isoserine =

Names
- IUPAC name 3-Amino-2-hydroxypropanoic acid
- Other names 3-Aminolactic acid

Identifiers
CAS Number	565-71-9
3D model (JSmol)	Interactive image
ChemSpider	10793
PubChem CID	11267
UNII	U7LTG62FEW
CompTox Dashboard (EPA)	DTXSID70870737
- InChI: InChI=1S/C3H7NO3/c4-1-2(5)3(6)7/h2,5H,1,4H2,(H,6,7) Key: BMYNFMYTOJXKLE-UHFFFAOYSA-N
- SMILES: C(C(C(=O)O)O)N

Properties
Chemical formula	C_{3}H_{7}NO_{3}
Molar mass	105.093 g·mol^{−1}

Hazards
- GHS labelling
Pictograms	(GHS07: Exclamation mark)
Signal word	Warning
Hazard statements	H315, H319, H335
Precautionary statements	P261, P264, P271, P280, P302+P352, P304+P340, P305+P351+P338, P312, P321, P332+P313, P337+P313, P362, P403+P233, P405, P501
- Except where otherwise noted, data are given for materials in their standard state (at 25 °C [77 °F], 100 kPa). Infobox references

Isoserine is a non-proteinogenic α-hydroxy-β-amino acid, and an isomer of serine. Non-proteinogenic amino acids are not part of the genetic code of any known organism. Isoserine has only been produced synthetically. Although it does not occur in natural proteins, such amino acids can be inserted into a protein through post-translational modification.

The first documented synthesis of isoserine in a laboratory setting was by Miyazawa et al., who published their results in 1976.

== See also ==
- Abiogenesis
- Miller–Urey experiment
