= Aleksei Bach =

Russian and Soviet biochemist (1857–1946)

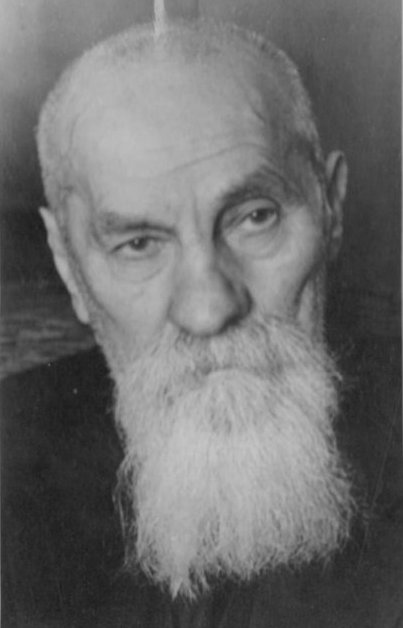
- Born: Abel Lipmanovich Bak; 17 March 1857; Zolotonosha, Poltava Governorate, Russian Empire (now Ukraine)
- Died: 13 May 1946 (aged 89); Moscow, Russian SFSR, Soviet Union
- Occupation: Chemist

Signature
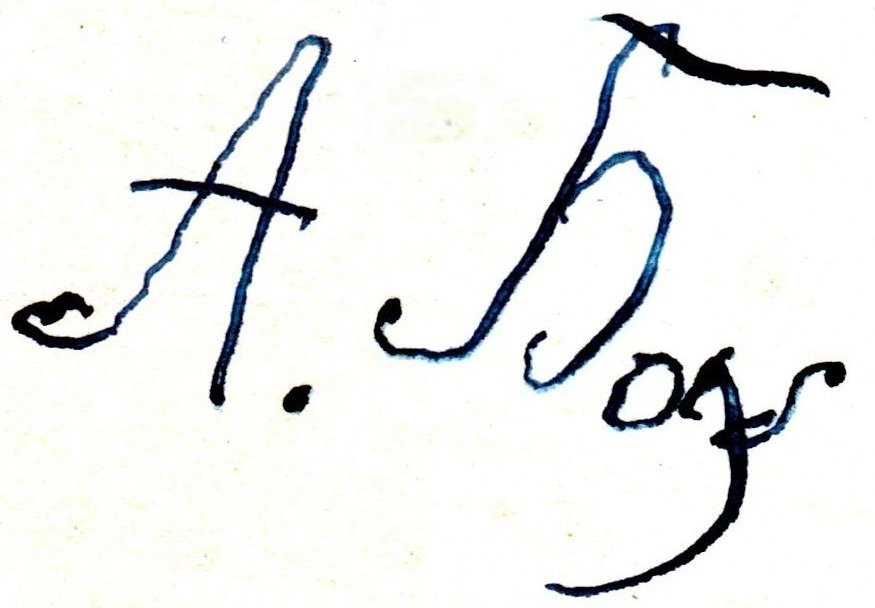

Aleksei Nikolayevich Bach or Bakh (Russian: Алексей Николаевич Бах; 17 March [O.S. 5 March] 1857 – 13 May 1946) was a Russian and Soviet biochemist and revolutionary. A prominent populist in the late 1870s and early 1880s, Bach left Russia before returning after the October Revolution in 1917. He was a member of the Academy of Sciences of the Soviet Union and senior member of the Supreme Soviet.

== Early life and education ==
Bach grew up in Boryspil, Poltava Governorate, to a wine distillery technician's family of Jewish origin as Abel (Abram) Lipmanovich Bak. After converting to Orthodox Christianity, he was baptised as Aleksei Nikolayevich Bach. In 1875, he graduated from a high school in Kiev. After that, he joined the Physico-Mathematical Department of at the University of Kiev. After various revolutionary efforts, he emigrated to France in 1885 and later to Switzerland.

However, in 1878 he was expelled for taking part in student disturbances, and he joined the Narodnaya Volya ("People's Freedom") revolutionary party, which was active against the tsarist regime. He was arrested and exiled to Belozersk, from where he returned to Kiev in December 1881 to continue his revolutionary activity. From 1883, Bach went underground to live in Kharkov, Yaroslavl, Kazan and Rostov. During that period, he wrote his celebrated revolutionary book Tsar Hunger, which played an important role in spreading the ideas of scientific socialism in Russia.

== Research ==
In 1885, after Narodnaya Volya was crushed, Bach emigrated to Paris to engage in scientific and literary work in the Montieur Scientifique journal. In 1890, he started experimental studies in the laboratory of Professor Paul Schützenberger, a well-known chemist at the Collège de France in Paris, which he followed in 1891 to a research trip in the United States. In 1894, Bach moved to Geneva, where he worked in his private chemical laboratory and did joint research with Professor R. Chodat of Geneva University, a well-known Swiss scientist. It was precisely during the Geneva period of his life that Bach developed his peroxide theory of respiratory processes and took active part in Swiss scientific activities.

Swiss scientists showed respect for Bach: the Geneva Society of Physical and Natural Sciences elected him its chairman for the year 1916.

He built up an international reputation in medical and agricultural chemistry for his research on catalysis and photosynthesis. Bach's scientific focus was the study of the assimilation of carbon dioxide as well as the mechanism of oxidation to peroxides. Engler-Bach peroxide theory was named after him.

Bach's initial works in the 1890s were devoted to the chemical mechanism of assimilation of carbon dioxide by green plants. At that time, Baeyer's concept was already prevalent in science. Proceeding from Butlerov's discovery that sugars form from formaldehyde under the effect of alkalis, Baeyer suggested that formaldehyde, which in condensing yields sugar, was the primary product of photosynthesis. In his works devoted to the biochemistry of photosynthesis, Bach, while agreeing with Baeyer in regard to the role of formaldehyde in the forming of sugar, gave a somewhat different interpretation of the mechanism itself.

== Political and public career ==
He was appointed its first director and the institute, where outstanding Soviet biochemists W.A. Engelgardt, A. E. Braunstein, B.I. Zbarsky, D.M. Mikhlin, A. I. Oparin, and others initially worked, played a major role in the development of biochemistry in the USSR. In 1929, Bach was elected full member of the USSR Academy of Sciences. In 1935, together with Oparin, he organized in Moscow the Institute of Biochemistry, Soviet Academy of Sciences, of which he was director to the last days of his life; the institute is now named after Bach. Also in 1935, Bach founded the Soviet scientific journal Biochemistry and was elected President of the D.I. Mendeleev All-Union Chemical Society. In 1939, he was elected Academician-Secretary, Division of Chemical Sciences, Soviet Academy of Sciences. In addition to being active in research and scientific organization, Bach was very active in public affairs: he was a member of the USSR Central Executive Committee and Deputy of the USSR Supreme Soviet.

A Bolshevik sympathizer, he moved back to Russia in 1917, and founded the Central Chemical Laboratory (the Karpov Physical Chemistry Institute from 1922), and remained there until his death. He undertook important research during the 1920s and advanced the use of chemicals in the food industry. He joined the Communist Party, 1927, and was made a member of the Soviet Central Executive Committee (VTslK), 1927. He was elected to the Soviet Academy of Sciences, 1929, and president of the All-Union Chemistry Society, 1932. He founded the Biochemistry Institute, Academy of Sciences of the Soviet Union, 1935, and also edited a biochemistry journal. As such he can be regarded as the father of Soviet biochemistry. He was elected a people's deputy, USSR Supreme Soviet, 1937, and became director of the department of chemical sciences, USSR Academy of Sciences, 1939. In the same year, as the oldest member of the Academy of Sciences, he proposed the academy to elect Joseph Stalin as an honorary member of the Soviet Academy of Sciences. He was awarded the Stalin Prize in 1941 and Hero of Socialist Labor in 1945. Bach was elected a member of the Party Central Committee, 1945. In 1928 he was elected a member of the Leopoldina.

His grave is located in the Novodevichy Cemetery (Plot 4, Row 24, No. 7) in Moscow.

== Sources ==
- Hildermeier, Manfred (2000). The Russian Socialist Revolutionary Party Before the First World War. LIT Verlag Münster. p. 376. ISBN 978-3-8258-4259-8.
- McCauley, Martin (11 September 2002). Who's Who in Russia since 1900. Routledge. pp. 30–31. ISBN 978-1-134-77214-8.
