= Sidney W. Fox =

American biochemist (1912–1998)

Sidney Fox
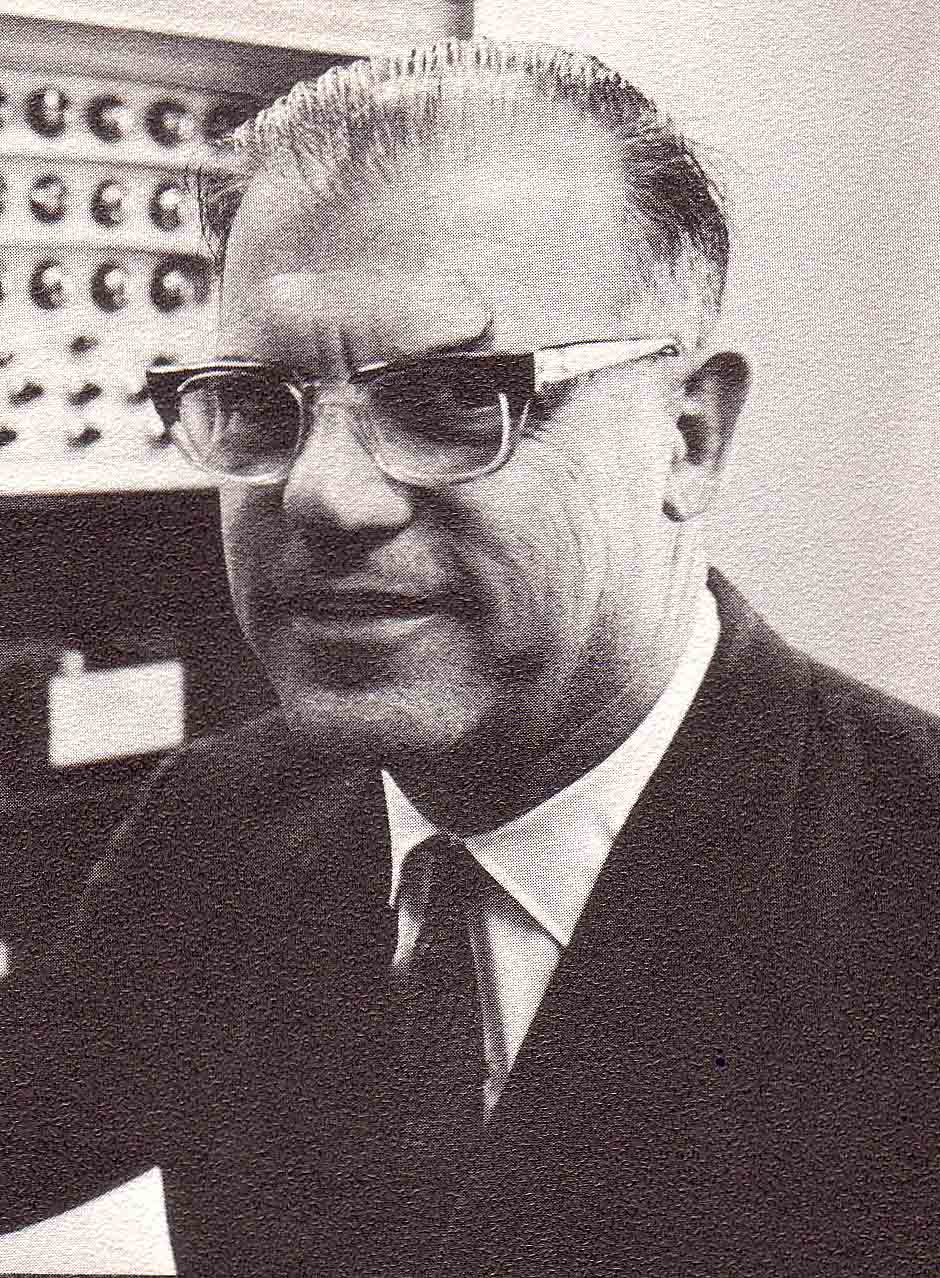
- Sidney Walter Fox
- Born: 24 March 1912; Los Angeles, California, U.S
- Died: 10 August 1998 (aged 86); Mobile, Alabama
- Education: University of California, Los Angeles (BA); California Institute of Technology (Ph.D.)
- Known for: Microspheres, studies of the origins of life
- Scientific career
- Fields: Biochemistry
- Workplaces: Iowa State College, Florida State University, University of Miami, Southern Illinois University, University of South Alabama

Sidney Walter Fox (24 March 1912 – 10 August 1998) was a Los Angeles-born biochemist responsible for discoveries on the origins of biological systems. Fox explored the synthesis of amino acids from inorganic molecules, the synthesis of proteinous amino acids and amino acid polymers called "proteinoids" from inorganic molecules and thermal energy, and created what he thought was the world's first protocell out of proteinoids and water. He called these globules "microspheres". Fox believed in the process of abiogenesis where life spontaneously organized itself from the colloquially known "primordial soup;" poolings of various simple organic molecules that existed during the time before life on Earth. He also suggested that his experiments possessed conditions that were similar to those of primordial Earth.

In his experiments, Fox demonstrated that it is possible to create protein-like structures from inorganic molecules and thermal energy. Fox went on to create microspheres that he said closely resembled bacterial cells and concluded that they could be similar to the earliest forms of life or protocells.

== Biography ==
=== Early years ===
Sidney Fox was the son of Jacob Fox, a wig-maker, and Louise Berman, a Ukrainian immigrant. Fox married Raia Joffe Fox and they had three sons: Lawrence, Ronald, and Thomas. All three of his sons became scientists. His family was Jewish.

Fox obtained a Bachelor of Arts degree from University of California, Los Angeles in Chemistry. He went on to earn a Ph.D. from California Institute of Technology in 1940 and did his postdoctoral work at the Linus Pauling Laboratory where he grew close with Linus Pauling.

=== Academic career ===
From 1943 to 1955, Fox was a full professor at Iowa State College. Fox became the head of the Iowa Agricultural Experimental Station's Chemistry Department from 1949 to 1955. In 1955, Sidney W. Fox moved to Florida State University and held the position of Professor of Chemistry, Director of the Oceanographic Institute, and Director of the Institute for Space Biosciences. In 1964, Fox moved to the University of Miami where he was a professor and the director of the Institute for Molecular Evolution for 25 years. The program was supported by the National Aeronautics and Space Administration (NASA). Fox also taught at the Southern Illinois University in the Department of Plant Biology as a Distinguished Research Professor. From there, Fox moved to the University of South Alabama where he was entitled Distinguished Research Scientist in the Marine Sciences department in 1993.

=== Later years ===
Nine years before his death, Fox underwent quintuple bypass surgery and was in a coma for 13 weeks. He survived without any major impairment and carried on with his career. Fox continued working as a professor up into his eighties. In 1996, 2 years before his death, Fox was elected Fellow of the International Society for the Study of the Origin of Life or ISSOL. Sidney Walter Fox died on Monday, August 10, 1998, in Mobile, Alabama.

== Theories ==
=== The production of amino acids from inorganic molecules ===
Sidney Fox based his experiments off of the information found in the Miller–Urey experiment. The Miller–Urey experiment was performed by scientist Stanley Miller under the guidance of Harold Urey in the early 1950s.

In the Miller–Urey experiment, water was boiled in a flask with the gases hydrogen, ammonia, and methane. The gases flowed through the apparatus past two electrodes that produced an electrical charge that acted as the lightning that would have been in the atmosphere before life on Earth. When the gases condensed after being cooled down, they fell back into the boiling flask. What Stanley Miller found in the flask when he observed the water were acids and amino acids. Amino acids are the necessary "building block" molecules for proteins. Stanley Miller and Harold Urey's experiment suggests that life formed from the presence of inorganic molecules, water, and electrical charge. These conditions are assumed to be similar to those of primordial earth.

In 1964, Fox and Kaoru Harada performed an experiment yielding similar results. In this experiment, methane flowed through a concentrated solution of ammonium hydroxide and then into a hot tube containing silica sand at about 1000 °C. Fox indicated that silica gel, volcanic lava, and alumina could be used in place of silica sand. The gas was then absorbed in cold, aqueous ammonia. The result was twelve protein-like amino acids: aspartic acid, glutamic acid, glycine, alanine, valine, leucine, isoleucine, serine, threonine, proline, tyrosine, and phenylalanine.

Many other similar experiments were carried out by teams of scientists such as Heyns and Pavel, Oro and Kamat, and Fox and Windsor that led to the production of amino acids.

=== The creation of proteinoids ===
One of the first experiments by Fox and Kaoru Harada that had to do with the formation of proteinoids was called Thermal Copolymerization of Amino Acids to a Product Resembling Protein. It was performed in February 1958.

The experiment began with L-glutamic acid heated in an oil bath. DL-aspartic acid and an amino acid mixture were added to the L-glutamic acid and heated for three hours in the oil bath under a layer of CO_{2}. The solution was cooled and the glass container it was in was rubbed with 20 mL of water and sat overnight. The result was a grainy precipitate. The next day, 10 mL of water and 10 mL of ethanol were added to the precipitate and filtered. The solid left over from filtering was put in cellophane dialysis tubing and left in a water bath for four days. When the inside of the tubes were observed and chromatograms were taken, it showed the presence of polypeptide chains. Fox called these protein-like structures "proteinoids." The polypeptide chains were composed of glutamic acid, aspartic acid, and amino acids and the percentages of each suggested that the arrangement of the constituents were non-random. The experiment was meant to resemble the drying-out of amino acids in similar conditions to those of primordial Earth. Extremely high temperatures, around 140-180 °C, are required to polymerize amino acids without a catalyst. Fox says in his publications that these temperatures could have been reached in three different scenarios on primordial Earth; hot springs, dried-up lagoons, and pressurized volcanic magma.

The experiment did not prove that proteins were formed on primordial earth using primarily heat, but Fox and Kaoru Harada believed it suggested that if proteinoids could be synthesized using just heat and the amino acids formed from the Miller–Urey experiment, then more research could lead to an answer to how anabolic reactions, enzymatic proteins, and nucleic acids were first formed and in turn, how the earliest forms of life originated.

Fox noted that there were various ways of setting up the experiment. One could also replace L-glutamic acid with L-glutamine without preheating it in an oil bath and then add phosphoric acid. The phosphoric acid would act as a catalyst for the formation of peptide bonds.

There are some that are skeptical of this type of experiment. These people believe that for the experiment to be plausible, prebiotic Earth would have needed high concentrations of the lysine, glutamic acid, and aspartic acid because they were at high concentrations in Fox's experiment. Some believe it is unlikely that primordial Earth had such a distribution of amino acids available on its surface.

=== The assembly of proteinoids into microspheres ===
Fox claims that the origin of the cell is a microsphere or protocell. Microspheres are made from the addition of water or salt solution to the appropriate proteinoids. To prepare microspheres, Fox added 10 mL of boiling salt solution to the hot proteinoids and stirred carefully. Then, he boiled the solution for thirty seconds, removed the solution from its vessel, and poured it into a cool vessel. When the solution was cooled, he observed the results under a microscope. One gram of protein polymer yields up to one billion microspheres with about ten billion molecules of proteinoid in each sphere. Fox says that the assembly of microspheres takes about twenty minutes and is more immediate and produces better microspheres if the water (or salt solution) is heated prior to mixing.

Microspheres have multiple properties that are similar to those of cells. The microspheres produced were mostly uniformly spherical and Fox believed that the shape and uniformity mimics that of coccoid bacteria. He also believed that the uniformity meant that there was a sophisticated system that kept the microspheres at equilibrium. The microspheres were able to asexually divide via binary fission, could form junctions with other microspheres, and developed a double membrane corresponding to that of a cell.

== Publications ==
Sidney Fox wrote or co-wrote about 380 published works, nine of which are books.

- Fox, Sidney W. (1957). Introduction to protein chemistry. New York: Wiley.
- Fox, Sidney W. (1965). The origins of prebiological systems and of their molecular matrices. New York: Acad. Pr.
- Fox, Sidney W.; Duane L Rohlfing, Aleksandr Ivanovich Oparin (1972). Molecular evolution: prebiological and biological. New York: Plenum Press.
- Fox, Sidney W., Klaus Dose; with a foreword by A. Oparin (1977). Molecular evolution and the origin of life (Rev. ed. ed.). New York: M. Dekker.
- Fox, Sidney W. (1984). Individuality and determinism: chemical and biological bases. New York: Plenum Press.
- Ho, edited by Mae-Wan; Fox, Sidney W. (1988). Evolutionary processes and metaphors. Chichester: Wiley. pp. 333. ISBN 0-471-91801-6.
- Fox, Sidney W. (1988). The emergence of life: Darwinian evolution from the inside. Basic Books.

== See also ==
- Abiogenesis
- Biochemistry
- Microsphere
- Proteinoid
- Stanley Miller
