= Jeffrey L. Bada =

American chemist (1942–2024)

- Born: September 10, 1942; San Diego, California, U.S.
- Died: September 1, 2024 (aged 81); San Diego, California, U.S.
- Education: San Diego State University (BS); University of California, San Diego (PhD)
- Known for: Studying the origin of life
- Scientific career
- Fields: Chemistry; Astrobiology
- Workplaces: University of California, San Diego
- Doctoral advisor: Stanley Miller
- Website: Homepage at SCRIPPS

Jeffrey Lee Bada (September 10, 1942 – September 1, 2024) was an American chemist known for his works in the study of the origin of life. He was a distinguished research professor of marine chemistry and a director of the NASA Specialized Center of Research and Training (NSCORT) in exobiology at the Scripps Institution of Oceanography, University of California, San Diego. Bada played a pioneering role in the development of the Mars Organic Detector (MOD) instrument package that is designed to search for amino acids and other organic compounds directly on the surface of Mars during future ESA and NASA missions.

== Biography ==
Born on September 10, 1942, Bada studied at San Diego State University and obtained a BS in chemistry in 1965. He wanted to become a theoretical chemist, applying quantum mechanics to chemistry and had no prior interest in prebiotic chemistry. He met Stanley Miller at the University of California, San Diego (UCSD), who inspired him to take up the spark discharge experiment a step forward by studying amino acid stability. Bada completed his PhD in chemistry in 1968 under Miller's supervision. He worked as research fellow at the Hoffman Labs of the department of geological science at Harvard University for one year. In 1968, he joined the UCSD Department of Chemistry as instructor, and became assistant professor of marine chemistry in 1969. He became associate professor in 1974 and full professor in 1980. Between 1980 and 2009 he was director of NASA Specialized Center of Research and Training (NSCORT) in Exobiology. In 2009 he was promoted to distinguished professor, and in 2010 to distinguished research professor. He released more than 200 technical publications. Bada died in San Diego on September 1, 2024, at the age of 81.

== Professional achievements ==
=== Geochemistry ===
As a marine geochemist, Bada did significant research in geochronology. During the 1970s and 1980s, he developed amino acid dating, an important technique in marine sediment dating through the measurement of the racemization rates of amino acids. This method is useful for dating a large span in geological time scale. This is useful in marine biology, paleontology, and archaeology for dating millions of years old organic materials based on their amino acid content.

=== Exobiology ===
Bada was a leading scientist in the study of organic compounds outside of the Earth. Among his works was the analysis of the Martian meteorite Nakhla, which fell in Egypt in 1911. His team found aspartic acid, glutamic acids, glycine, alanine, beta-alanine, and gamma-aminobutyric acid as the most abundant amino acids in the meteorite. This a supports the notion that the organic building blocks of life could be naturally synthesized and were present in the making of the Solar System. He and his team also developed a Mars Organic Analyzer (MOA), which is a microfabricated capillary electrophoresis (CE) instrument for sensitive amino acid biomarker analysis. The device is useful in planetary exploration such as for the analysis of even trace amounts of amino acids, mono- and diaminoalkanes, amino sugars, nucleobases, and nucleobase degradation products from living and non-living materials.

=== Prebiotic chemistry ===
Jeffrey Bada is best known for his research on the origin of life, following his mentor Miller, whose laboratory he inherited. His most famous works, perhaps, are his reassessment and validation of the original Miller's experiments. In 1999, Miller had a stroke and on thinking of his medical condition, he donated everything in his office to Bada's laboratory. Just before Miller's death in 2007, several cardboard boxes containing vials of dried residues were found in his laboratory at UCSD. The labels indicated that some were from Miller's original 1952–1954 experiments, produced by using three different apparatuses, and one from 1958, which included H_{2}S in the gaseous mixture for the first time and the result never published. In 2008 Bada and his team reported a re-analysis of the 1952 samples using more sensitive techniques, such as high-performance liquid chromatography and liquid chromatography–time of flight mass spectrometry. Their result showed the synthesis of 22 amino acids and 5 amines, revealing that the original Miller experiment produced many more compounds than previously believed. Miller's report of 1953 mentioned synthesis of only glycine, α- and β-alanine, with uncertain aspartic acid and GABA. In addition Bada also analysed the unreported 1958 samples in 2011, from which 23 amino acids and 4 amines, including 7 organosulfur compounds, were detected.
