= Miller–Urey experiment =

Experiment testing the origin of life

The Miller–Urey experiment was a synthesis of small organic molecules in a mixture of simple gases in a thermal gradient created by heating (right) and cooling (left) the mixture at the same time, with electrical discharges.

The Miller–Urey experiment, or Miller experiment, was an experiment in chemical synthesis carried out in 1952 that simulated the conditions thought at the time to be present in the atmosphere of the early, prebiotic Earth. It is seen as one of the first successful experiments demonstrating the synthesis of organic compounds from inorganic constituents in an origin of life scenario. The experiment used methane (CH_{4}), ammonia (NH_{3}), hydrogen (H_{2}), in ratio 2:2:1, and water (H_{2}O). Applying an electric arc (simulating lightning) resulted in the production of amino acids.

It is regarded as a groundbreaking experiment, and the classic experiment investigating the origin of life (abiogenesis). It was performed in 1952 by Stanley Miller, supervised by Nobel laureate Harold Urey at the University of Chicago, and published the following year. At the time, it supported Alexander Oparin's and J. B. S. Haldane's hypothesis that the conditions on the primitive Earth favored chemical reactions that synthesized complex organic compounds from simpler inorganic precursors.

After Miller's death in 2007, scientists examining sealed vials preserved from the original experiments showed that more amino acids were produced in the original experiment than Miller reported with paper chromatography. While evidence suggests that Earth's prebiotic atmosphere might typically have had a composition different from the gas used in the Miller experiment, prebiotic experiments continue to produce racemic mixtures of simple-to-complex organic compounds, including amino acids, under varying conditions. Moreover, researchers have shown that transient, hydrogen-rich atmospheres – conducive to Miller–Urey synthesis – would have occurred after large asteroid impacts on early Earth.

== History ==
=== Foundations of organic synthesis and the origin of life ===
Until the 19th century, there was considerable acceptance of the theory of spontaneous generation, the idea that "lower" animals, such as insects or rodents, arose from decaying matter. However, several experiments in the 19th century – particularly Louis Pasteur's swan neck flask experiment in 1859 — disproved the theory that life arose from decaying matter. Charles Darwin published On the Origin of Species that same year, describing the mechanism of biological evolution. While Darwin never publicly wrote about the first organism in his theory of evolution, in a letter to Joseph Dalton Hooker, he speculated:

But if (and oh what a big if) we could conceive in some warm little pond with all sorts of ammonia and phosphoric salts, light, heat, electricity etcetera present, that a protein compound was chemically formed, ready to undergo still more complex changes [...]"

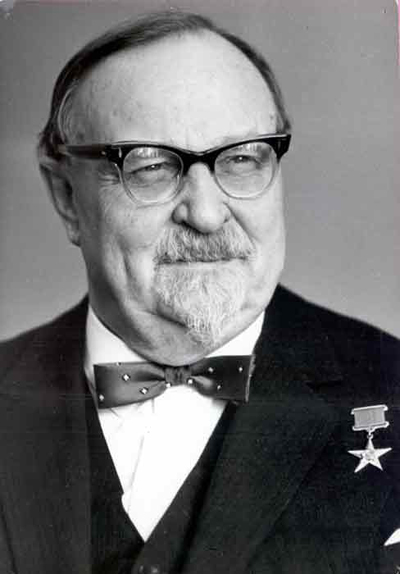
Portrait photograph of Alexander Oparin

At this point, it was known that organic molecules could be formed from inorganic starting materials, as Friedrich Wöhler had described the Wöhler synthesis of urea from ammonium cyanate in 1828. Several other early seminal works in the field of organic synthesis followed, including Alexander Butlerov's synthesis of sugars from formaldehyde and Adolph Strecker's synthesis of the amino acid alanine from acetaldehyde, ammonia, and hydrogen cyanide. In 1913, Walther Löb synthesized amino acids by exposing formamide to silent electric discharge, so scientists were beginning to produce the building blocks of life from simpler molecules, but these were not intended to simulate any prebiotic scheme or were even considered relevant to origin of life questions.

But the scientific literature of the early 20th century contained speculations on the origin of life. In 1903, physicist Svante Arrhenius hypothesized that the first microscopic forms of life, driven by the radiation pressure of stars, could have arrived on Earth from space in the panspermia hypothesis. In the 1920s, Leonard Troland wrote about a primordial enzyme that could have formed by chance in the primitive ocean and catalyzed reactions, and Hermann J. Muller suggested that the formation of a gene with catalytic and autoreplicative properties could have set evolution in motion. Around the same time, Alexander Oparin's and J. B. S. Haldane's "Primordial soup" ideas were emerging, which hypothesized that a chemically-reducing atmosphere present on early Earth would have been conducive to organic synthesis in the presence of sunlight or lightning, gradually concentrating the ocean with random organic molecules until life emerged. In this way, frameworks for the origin of life were coming together, but at the mid-20th century, these hypotheses lacked direct experimental evidence.

=== Stanley Miller and Harold Urey ===
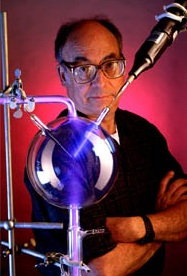
Stanley Miller in 1999, posed with an apparatus like that used in the original experiment

At the time of the Miller–Urey experiment, Harold Urey was a Professor of Chemistry at the University of Chicago who had a well-renowned career, including receiving the Nobel Prize in Chemistry in 1934 for his isolation of deuterium and leading efforts to utilise gaseous diffusion for uranium isotope enrichment in support of the Manhattan Project. In 1952, Urey postulated that the high temperatures and energies associated with large impacts in Earth's early history would have provided an atmosphere of methane (CH_{4}), water (H_{2}O), ammonia (NH_{3}), and hydrogen (H_{2}), creating the reducing environment necessary for the Oparin-Haldane "primordial soup" scenario.

Stanley Miller arrived at the University of Chicago in 1951 to pursue a PhD under nuclear physicist Edward Teller, another prominent figure in the Manhattan Project. Miller began to work on how different chemical elements were formed in the early universe, but, after a year of minimal progress, Teller was to leave for California to establish Lawrence Livermore National Laboratory and further nuclear weapons research. Miller, having seen Urey lecture on his 1952 paper, approached him about the possibility of a prebiotic synthesis experiment. While Urey initially discouraged Miller, he agreed to allow Miller to try for a year. By February 1953, Miller had mailed a manuscript as sole author reporting the results of his experiment to Science. Urey refused to be listed on the manuscript because he believed his status would cause others to underappreciate Miller's role in designing and conducting the experiment and so he encouraged Miller to take full credit for the work. Despite this, the setup's name is still commonly referenced with both their names. After not hearing from Science for a few weeks, a furious Urey wrote to the editorial board demanding an answer, stating, "If Science does not wish to publish this promptly we will send it to the Journal of the American Chemical Society." Miller's manuscript was eventually published in Science in May 1953.

== Experiment ==
Descriptive video of the experiment

In the original 1952 experiment, methane (CH_{4}), ammonia (NH_{3}), and hydrogen (H_{2}) were all sealed together in a 2:2:1 ratio (1 part H_{2}) inside a sterile 5-L glass flask, connected to a 500-mL flask half-full of water (H_{2}O). The gas chamber was intended to represent Earth's prebiotic atmosphere, while the water simulated an ocean. The water in the smaller flask was boiled such that water vapor entered the gas chamber and mixed with the "atmosphere". A continuous electrical spark was discharged between a pair of electrodes in the larger flask. The spark passed through the mixture of gases and water vapor, simulating lightning. A condenser below the gas chamber allowed aqueous solution to accumulate into a U-shaped trap at the bottom of the apparatus, which was sampled.

After a day, the solution that had collected at the trap was pink, and after a week of continuous operation the solution was a deep red and turbid, which Miller attributed to organic matter absorbed onto colloidal silica. The boiling flask was then removed, and mercuric chloride (a poison) was added to prevent microbial contamination. The reaction was stopped by adding barium hydroxide and sulfuric acid, and evaporated to remove impurities. Using paper chromatography, Miller identified five amino acids present in the solution: glycine, α-alanine and β-alanine were positively identified, while aspartic acid and α-aminobutyric acid (AABA) were less certain, due to the spots being faint.

Materials and samples from the original experiments remained in 2017 under the care of Miller's former student, Jeffrey Bada, a professor at the UCSD, Scripps Institution of Oceanography who also conducts origin of life research. As of 2013, the apparatus used to conduct the experiment was on display at the Denver Museum of Nature and Science.

== Chemistry of experiment ==
In 1957 Miller published research describing the chemical processes occurring inside his experiment. Hydrogen cyanide (HCN) and aldehydes (e.g., formaldehyde, acetaldehyde) were demonstrated to form as intermediates early on in the experiment due to the electric discharge. This agrees with current understanding of atmospheric chemistry, as HCN can generally be produced from reactive radical species in the atmosphere that arise when CH_{4} and nitrogen break apart under ultraviolet (UV) light. Similarly, aldehydes can be generated in the atmosphere from radicals resulting from CH_{4} and H_{2}O decomposition and other intermediates like methanol. Several energy sources in planetary atmospheres can induce these dissociation reactions and subsequent hydrogen cyanide or aldehyde formation, including lightning, ultraviolet light, and galactic cosmic rays.

For example, here is a set photochemical reactions of species in the Miller–Urey atmosphere that can result in formaldehyde:

H_{2}O + hv → H + OH
CH_{4} + OH → CH_{3} + HOH
CH_{3} + OH → CH_{3}OH
CH_{3}OH + hv → CH_{2}O (formaldehyde) + H_{2}

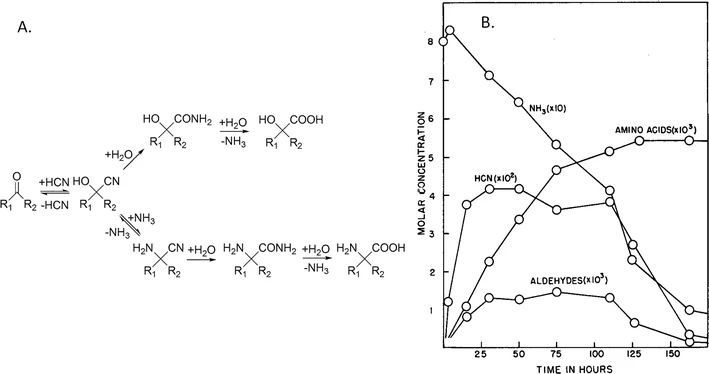
A) Cyanohydrin (top) and Strecker (bottom) schemes for synthesis of hydroxy acids and amino acids, respectively. B) Concentrations of ammonia, aldehydes, hydrogen cyanide, and amino acids during a Miller–Urey experiment, reproduced from Miller (1957) by Cleaves (2012). The concentrations of aldehydes and hydrogen cyanide during amino acid production in aqueous solution provided strong evidence that Strecker synthesis occurs in Miller–Urey chemical environments. Production of hydroxy acids through the cyanohydrin scheme also likely occurs. From: Cleaves, H.J. Prebiotic Chemistry: What We Know, What We Don't. Evo Edu Outreach 5, 342–360 (2012). Licensed under CC-BY 2.0.

A photochemical path to HCN from NH_{3} and CH_{4} is:

NH_{3} + hv → NH_{2} + H
NH_{2} + CH_{4} → NH_{3} + CH_{3}
NH_{2} + CH_{3} → CH_{5}N
CH_{5}N + hv → HCN + 2H_{2}

Other active intermediate compounds (acetylene, cyanoacetylene, etc.) have been detected in the aqueous solution of Miller–Urey-type experiments, but the immediate HCN and aldehyde production, the production of amino acids accompanying the plateau in HCN and aldehyde concentrations, and slowing of amino acid production rate during HCN and aldehyde depletion provided strong evidence that Strecker amino acid synthesis was occurring in the aqueous solution.

Strecker synthesis describes the reaction of an aldehyde, ammonia, and HCN to a simple amino acid through an aminoacetonitrile intermediate:

CH_{2}O + HCN + NH_{3} → NH_{2}-CH_{2}-CN (aminoacetonitrile) + H_{2}O
NH_{2}-CH_{2}-CN + 2H_{2}O → NH_{3} + NH_{2}-CH_{2}-COOH (glycine)

Furthermore, water and formaldehyde can react via Butlerov's reaction to produce various sugars, such as ribose.

The experiments showed that simple organic compounds, including the building blocks of proteins and other macromolecules, can abiotically form from gases with the addition of energy.

== Related experiments and follow-up work ==
=== Contemporary experiments ===
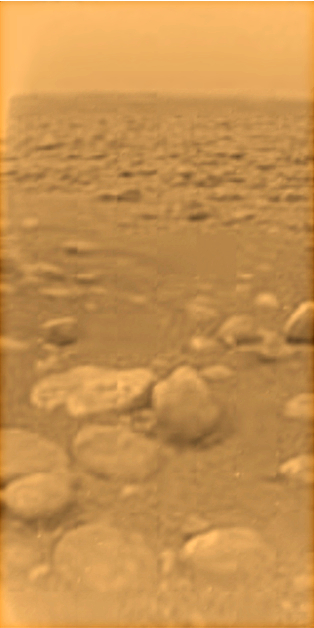
The surface of Titan as viewed from the Huygens lander. Tholins, complex particles formed by UV irradiation on the N_{2} and CH_{4} atmosphere, are likely the source of the reddish haze.

There were a few similar spark discharge experiments contemporaneous with Miller–Urey. An article in The New York Times (March 8, 1953) titled "Looking Back Two Billion Years" describes the work of Wollman M. MacNevin at Ohio State University, before the Miller Science paper was published in May 1953. MacNevin was passing 100,000V sparks through methane and water vapor and produced "resinous solids" that were "too complex for analysis." Furthermore, K. A. Wilde submitted a manuscript to Science on December 15, 1952, before Miller submitted his paper to the same journal in February 1953. Wilde's work, published on July 10, 1953, used voltages up to only 600V on a binary mixture of carbon dioxide (CO_{2}) and water in a flow system and did not note any significant reduction products. According to some, the reports of these experiments explain why Urey was rushing Miller's manuscript through Science, and threatened to submit it to the Journal of the American Chemical Society.

By introducing an experimental framework to test prebiotic chemistry, the Miller–Urey experiment paved the way for future origin of life research. In 1961, Joan Oró produced milligrams of the nucleobase adenine from a concentrated solution of HCN and NH_{3} in water. Oró found that several amino acids were also formed from HCN and ammonia under those conditions. Experiments conducted later showed that the other RNA and DNA nucleobases could be obtained through simulated prebiotic chemistry with a reducing atmosphere. Other researchers also began using UV-photolysis in prebiotic schemes, as the UV flux would have been much higher on early Earth. For example, UV-photolysis of water vapor with carbon monoxide was found to yield various alcohols, aldehydes, and organic acids. In the 1970s, Carl Sagan used Miller–Urey-type reactions to synthesize and experiment with complex organic particles dubbed "tholins", which likely resemble particles formed in hazy atmospheres like that of Titan.

=== Modified Miller–Urey experiments ===
Much work has been done since the 1950s toward understanding how Miller–Urey chemistry behaves in various environmental settings.

Different atmospheric compositions. In 1983, testing different atmospheric compositions, Miller and another researcher repeated experiments with varying proportions of H_{2}, H_{2}O, N_{2}, CO_{2} or CH_{4}, and sometimes NH_{3}. They found that the presence or absence of NH_{3} in the mixture did not significantly impact amino acid yield, as NH_{3} was generated from N_{2} during the spark discharge. Additionally, CH_{4} proved to be one of the most important atmospheric ingredients for high yields, likely due to its role in HCN formation. Much lower yields were obtained with more oxidized carbon species in place of CH_{4}, but similar yields could be reached with a high H_{2}/CO_{2} ratio. Thus, Miller–Urey reactions work in atmospheres of other compositions as well, depending on the ratio of reducing and oxidizing gases.

Role of nitrites and calcium carbonate. More recently, Jeffrey Bada and H. James Cleaves, graduate students of Miller, hypothesized that the production of nitrites, which destroy amino acids, in CO_{2} and N_{2}-rich atmospheres may explain low amino acids yields. In a Miller–Urey setup with a less-reducing (CO_{2} + N_{2} + H_{2}O) atmosphere, when they added calcium carbonate to buffer the aqueous solution and ascorbic acid to inhibit oxidation, yields of amino acids greatly increased, demonstrating that amino acids can still be formed in more neutral atmospheres under the right geochemical conditions. In a prebiotic context, they argued that seawater would likely still be buffered and ferrous iron could inhibit oxidation.

Steam and hydrogen sulfide. In 1999, after Miller suffered a stroke, he donated the contents of his laboratory to Bada. In an old cardboard box, Bada discovered unanalyzed samples from modified experiments that Miller had conducted in the 1950s. In a "volcanic" apparatus, Miller had amended an aspirating nozzle to shoot a jet of steam into the reaction chamber. Using high-performance liquid chromatography and mass spectrometry, Bada's lab analyzed old samples from a set of experiments Miller conducted with this apparatus and found some higher yields and a more diverse suite of amino acids. Bada speculated that injecting the steam into the spark could have split water into H and OH radicals, leading to more hydroxylated amino acids during Strecker synthesis. In a separate set of experiments, Miller added hydrogen sulfide (H_{2}S) to the reducing atmosphere, and Bada's analyses of the products suggested order-of-magnitude higher yields, including some amino acids with sulfur moieties.

Free electrons and charged microdroplets. A 2021 work highlighted the importance of the high-energy free electrons present in the experiment. It is these electrons that produce ions and radicals, and represent an aspect of the experiment that needs to be better understood.

A 2025 study used charges from sprays of water instead of lightning to produce electricity. When spraying microdroplets of water into a mixture of gases assumed to make up the earth's atmosphere before the origin of life, microelectric discharges between oppositely charged microdroplets occurred and was able to produce organic molecules.

Silicate. After comparing Miller–Urey experiments conducted in borosilicate glassware with those conducted in Teflon apparatuses, a 2021 paper suggests that the glass reaction vessel acts as a mineral catalyst, implicating silicate rocks as important surfaces in prebiotic Miller–Urey reactions.

== Early Earth's prebiotic atmosphere ==
While there is a lack of geochemical observations to constrain the exact composition of the prebiotic atmosphere, recent models point to an early "weakly reducing" atmosphere; that is, early Earth's atmosphere was likely dominated by CO_{2} and N_{2} and not CH_{4} and NH_{3} as used in the original Miller–Urey experiment. This is explained, in part, by the chemical composition of volcanic outgassing. Geologist William Rubey was one of the first to compile data on gases emitted from modern volcanoes and concluded that they are rich in CO_{2}, H_{2}O, and likely N_{2}, with varying amounts of H_{2}, sulfur dioxide (SO_{2}), and H_{2}S. Therefore, if the redox state of Earth's mantle — which dictates the composition of outgassing – has been constant since formation, then the atmosphere of early Earth was likely weakly reducing, but there are some arguments for a more-reducing atmosphere for the first few hundred million years.

While the prebiotic atmosphere could have had a different redox condition than that of the Miller–Urey atmosphere, the modified Miller–Urey experiments described in the above section demonstrated that amino acids can still be abiotically produced in less-reducing atmospheres under specific geochemical conditions. Furthermore, harkening back to Urey's original hypothesis of a "post-impact" reducing atmosphere, a recent atmospheric modeling study has shown that an iron-rich impactor with a minimum mass around 4×10^{20} – 5×10^{21} kg would be enough to transiently reduce the entire prebiotic atmosphere, resulting in a Miller–Urey-esque H_{2}-, CH_{4}-, and NH_{3}-dominated atmosphere that persists for millions of years. Previous work has estimated from the lunar cratering record and composition of Earth's mantle that between four and seven such impactors reached the Hadean Earth.

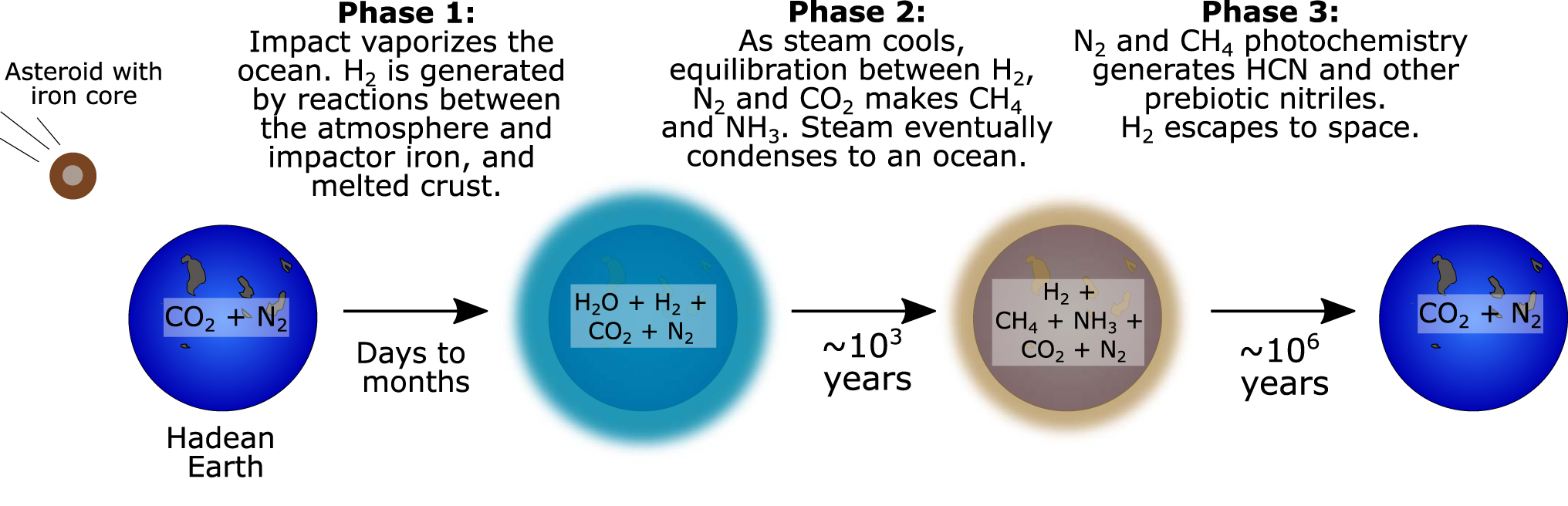
Conceptual figure from Wogan et al. (2023) depicting three stages phases of atmospheric chemistry after a large asteroid impact on the Hadean Earth. In phase 1, the impactor vaporizes the ocean, and H_{2} is generated after iron delivered by the impactor reacts with hot steam. In phase 2, H_{2} reacts with CO_{2} to produce CH_{4} while the atmosphere cools for thousands of years and steam condenses to an ocean. Phase 3 represents the Miller–Urey atmosphere that persists for millions of years, where N_{2} and CH_{4} photochemistry generates HCN. The atmosphere returns to a CO_{2} and N_{2} dominated atmosphere after H_{2} escapes from Earth to space. From: Nicholas F. Wogan et al 2023 Planet. Sci. J. 4 169. Licensed under CC-BY 4.0.

A large factor controlling the redox budget of early Earth's atmosphere is the rate of atmospheric escape of H_{2} after Earth's formation. Atmospheric escape – common to young, rocky planets — occurs when gases in the atmosphere have sufficient kinetic energy to overcome gravitational energy. It is generally accepted that the timescale of hydrogen escape is short enough such that H_{2} made up < 1% of the atmosphere of prebiotic Earth, but, in 2005, a hydrodynamic model of hydrogen escape predicted escape rates two orders of magnitude lower than previously thought, maintaining a hydrogen mixing ratio of 30%. A hydrogen-rich prebiotic atmosphere would have large implications for Miller–Urey synthesis in the Hadean and Archean, but later work suggests solutions in that model might have violated conservation of mass and energy. That said, during hydrodynamic escape, lighter molecules like hydrogen can "drag" heavier molecules with them through collisions, and recent modeling of xenon escape has pointed to a hydrogen atmospheric mixing ratio of at least 1% or higher at times during the Archean.

Taken together, the view that early Earth's atmosphere was weakly reducing, with transient instances of highly-reducing compositions following large impacts is generally supported.

== Extraterrestrial sources of amino acids ==
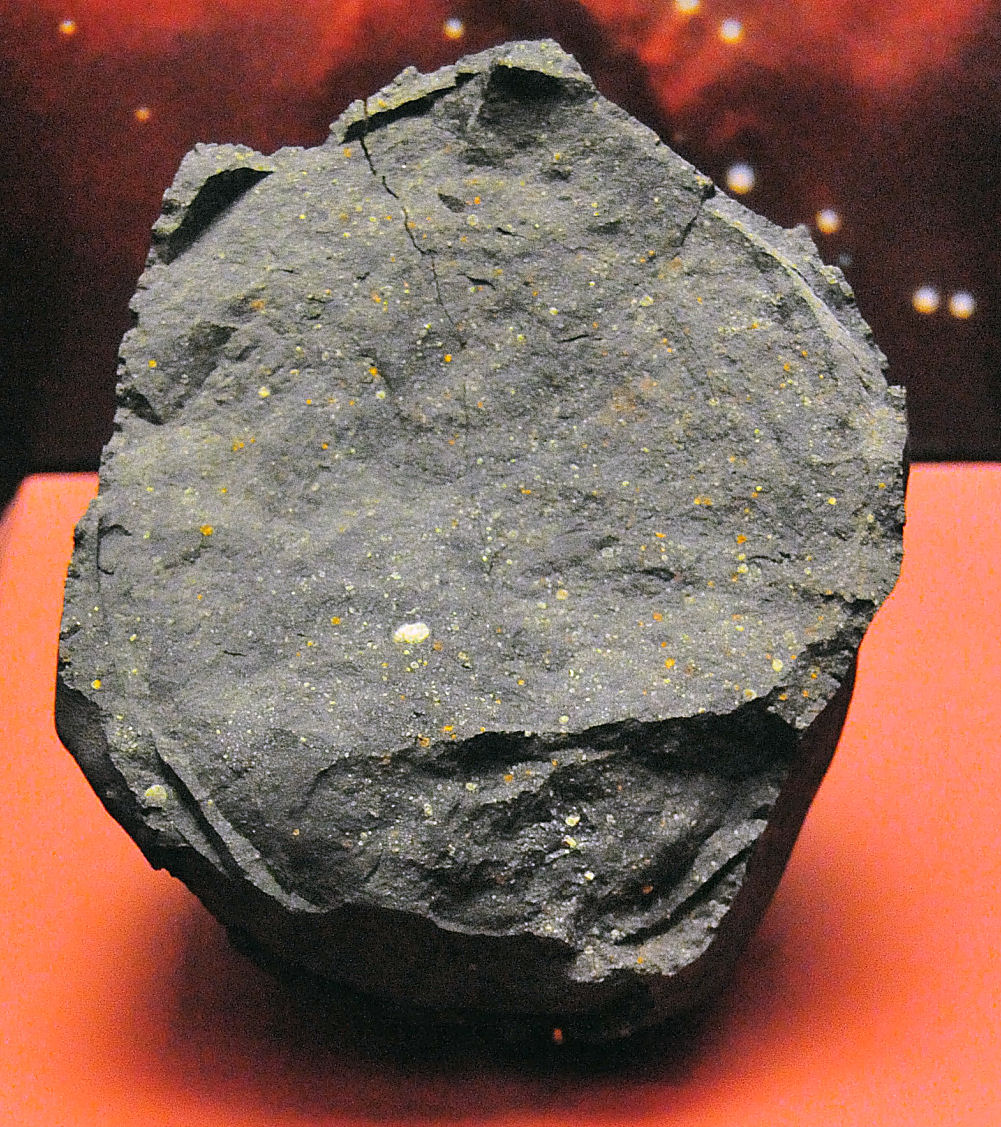
A sample of the Murchison meteorite on display at the National Museum of Natural History, Washington, D.C.

Conditions similar to those of the Miller–Urey experiments are present in other regions of the Solar System, often substituting ultraviolet light for lightning as the energy source for chemical reactions. The Murchison meteorite that fell near Murchison, Victoria, Australia in 1969 was found to contain an amino acid distribution remarkably similar to Miller–Urey discharge products. Analysis of the organic fraction of the Murchison meteorite with Fourier-transform ion cyclotron resonance mass spectrometry detected over 10,000 unique compounds, albeit at very low (ppb–ppm) concentrations. In this way, the organic composition of the Murchison meteorite is seen as evidence of Miller–Urey synthesis outside Earth.

Comets and other icy outer-solar-system bodies are thought to contain large amounts of complex carbon compounds (such as tholins) formed by processes akin to Miller–Urey setups, darkening the surfaces of these bodies. Some argue that comets bombarding the early Earth could have provided a large supply of complex organic molecules along with the water and other volatiles, however very low concentrations of biologically-relevant material combined with uncertainty surrounding the survival of organic matter upon impact make this difficult to determine.

== Relevance to the origin of life ==
The Miller–Urey experiment was proof that the building blocks of life could be synthesized abiotically from gases, and introduced a new prebiotic chemistry framework through which to study the origin of life. Simulations of protein sequences present in the last universal common ancestor (LUCA), or the last shared ancestor of all extant species today, show an enrichment in simple amino acids that were available in the prebiotic environment according to Miller–Urey chemistry. This suggests that the genetic code from which all life evolved was rooted in a smaller suite of amino acids than those used today. Thus, while creationist arguments focus on the fact that Miller–Urey experiments have not generated all 22 genetically-encoded amino acids, this does not actually conflict with the evolutionary perspective on the origin of life.

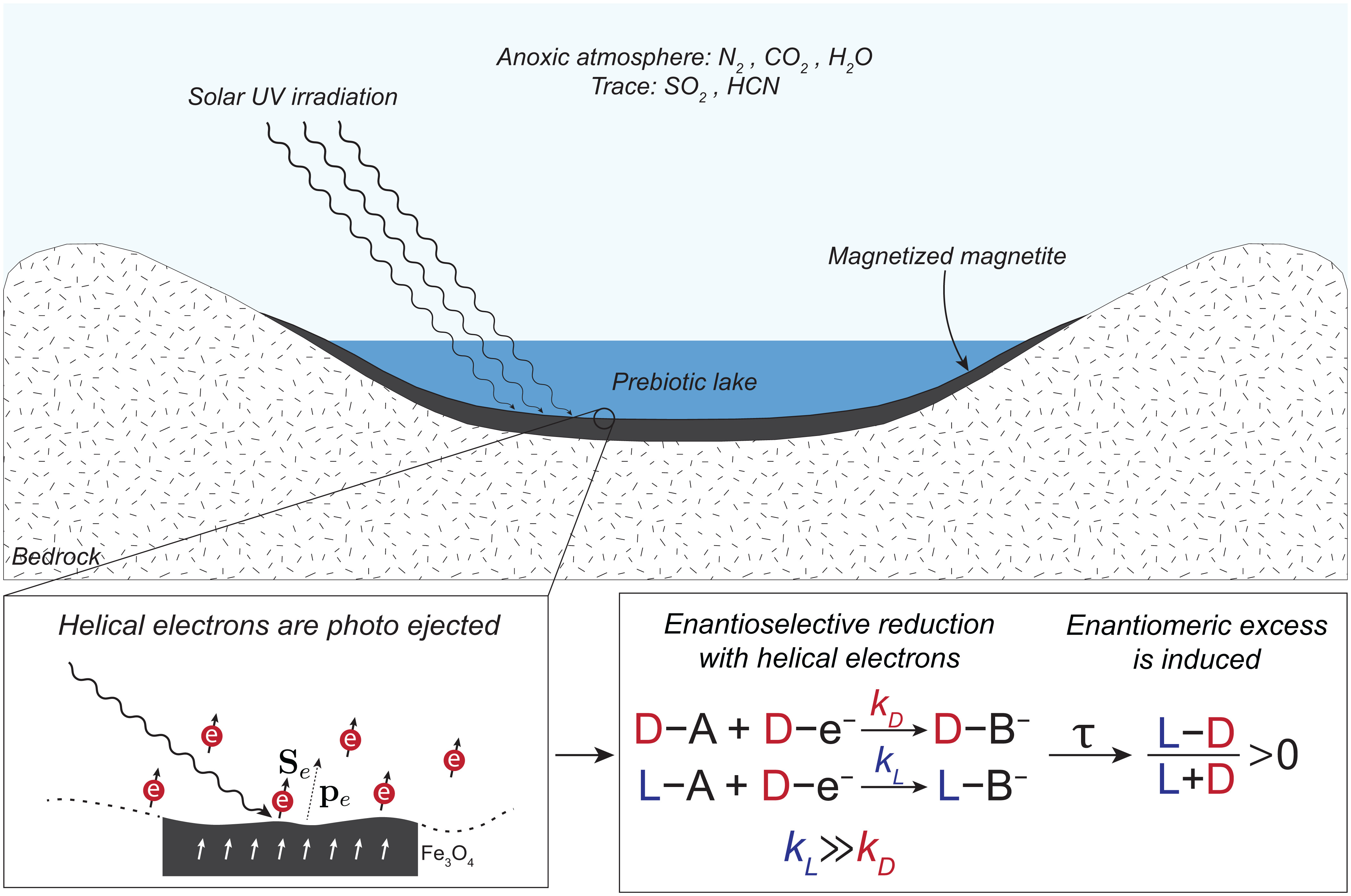
Conceptual figure from Ozturk and Sasselov (2022) of a plausible prebiotic scenario with an enantioselective bias. Irradiation of magnetized magnetite with ultraviolet light generates spin-selective electrons. The helicity of the electrons leads to different redox reaction rates with different stereoisomers, leading to enantioselective products. Mechanisms like these mean that Miller–Urey and other prebiotic syntheses do not need to be enantioselective, as the environment can introduce homochirality. From: Ozturk, S.F. and Sasselov, D.D. On the origins of life's homochirality: inducing enantiomeric excess with spin-polarized electrons. Proceedings of the National Academy of Sciences 119 (28) e2204765119 (2022). Licensed under CC-BY 4.0.

Another common criticism is that the racemic mixture (containing both L and D enantiomers) of amino acids produced in a Miller–Urey experiment is not exemplary of abiogenesis theories, as life on Earth today uses almost exclusively L-amino acids. While it is true that Miller–Urey setups produce racemic mixtures, the origin of homochirality is a separate area in origin of life research.

Recent work demonstrates that magnetic mineral surfaces like magnetite can be templates for the enantioselective crystallization of chiral molecules, including RNA precursors, due to the chiral-induced spin selectivity (CISS) effect. Once an enantioselective bias is introduced, homochirality can then propagate through biological systems in various ways. In this way, enantioselective synthesis is not required of Miller–Urey reactions if other geochemical processes in the environment are introducing homochirality.

Finally, Miller–Urey and similar experiments primarily deal with the synthesis of monomers; polymerization of these building blocks to form peptides and other more complex structures is the next step of prebiotic chemistry schemes. Polymerization requires condensation reactions, which are thermodynamically unfavored in aqueous solutions because they expel water molecules. Scientists as far back as John Desmond Bernal in the late 1940s thus speculated that clay surfaces would play a large role in abiogenesis, as they might concentrate monomers. Several such models for mineral-mediated polymerization have emerged, such as the interlayers of layered double hydroxides like green rust over wet-dry cycles. Some scenarios for peptide formation have been proposed that are even compatible with aqueous solutions, such as the hydrophobic air-water interface and a novel "sulfide-mediated α-aminonitrile ligation" scheme, where amino acid precursors come together to form peptides. Polymerization of life's building blocks is an active area of research in prebiotic chemistry.

== Amino acids identified ==
Below is a table of amino acids produced and identified in the "classic" 1952 experiment, as analyzed by Miller in 1952 and more recently by Bada and collaborators with modern mass spectrometry, the 2008 re-analysis of vials from the volcanic spark discharge experiment, and the 2010 re-analysis of vials from the H_{2}S-rich spark discharge experiment. While not all proteinogenic amino acids have been produced in spark discharge experiments, it is generally accepted that early life used a simpler set of prebiotically-available amino acids.

Amino acid	Produced in experiment				Proteinogenic
Amino acid	Miller–Urey (1952)	Bada reanalysis of 1950s product (2008–)	Volcanic spark discharge (2008)	H_{2}S-rich spark discharge (2010)	Proteinogenic
Glycine	Yes	Yes	Yes	Yes	Yes
α-Alanine	Yes	Yes	Yes	Yes	Yes
β-Alanine	Yes	Yes	Yes	Yes	No
Aspartic acid	Yes	Yes	Yes	Yes	Yes
α-Aminobutyric acid	Yes	Yes	Yes	Yes	No
Serine	No	Yes	Yes	Yes	Yes
Isoserine	No	No	Yes	Yes	No
α-Aminoisobutyric acid	No	Yes	Yes	Yes	No
β-Aminoisobutyric acid	No	Yes	Yes	Yes	No
β-Aminobutyric acid	No	Yes	Yes	Yes	No
γ-Aminobutyric acid	No	Yes	Yes	Yes	No
Valine	No	Yes	Yes	Yes	Yes
Isovaline	No	Yes	Yes	Yes	No
Glutamic acid	No	Yes	Yes	Yes	Yes
Norvaline	No	Yes	Yes	No	No
Methylamine	No	Yes	Yes	Yes	No
Ethylamine	No	Yes	Yes	Yes	No
Ethanolamine	No	Yes	Yes	Yes	No
Isopropylamine	No	Yes	Yes	No	No
n-Propylamine	No	Yes	Yes	No	No
α-Aminoadipic acid	No	No	Yes	No	No
Homoserine	No	No	Yes	No	No
2-Methylserine	No	No	Yes	No	No
β-Hydroxyaspartic acid	No	No	Yes	No	No
Ornithine	No	No	Yes	No	No
2-Methylglutamic acid	No	No	Yes	No	No
Phenylalanine	No	No	Yes	No	Yes
Homocysteic acid	No	No	No	Yes	No
S-Methylcysteine	No	No	No	Yes	No
Methionine	No	No	No	Yes	Yes
Methionine sulfoxide	No	No	No	Yes	No
Methionine sulfone	No	No	No	Yes	No
Isoleucine	No	No	No	Yes	Yes
Leucine	No	No	No	Yes	Yes
Ethionine	No	No	No	Yes	No
Cysteine	No	No	No	No	Yes
Histidine	No	No	No	No	Yes
Lysine	No	No	No	No	Yes
Asparagine	No	No	No	No	Yes
Pyrrolysine	No	No	No	No	Yes
Proline	No	No	No	No	Yes
Glutamine	No	No	No	No	Yes
Arginine	No	No	No	No	Yes
Threonine	No	No	No	No	Yes
Selenocysteine	No	No	No	No	Yes
Tryptophan	No	No	No	No	Yes
Tyrosine	No	No	No	No	Yes
