= Stanley Miller =

American scientist (1930–2007)

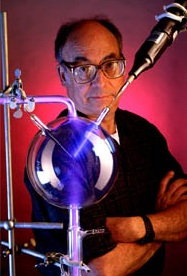
- Miller in 1999
- Born: Stanley Lloyd Miller; March 7, 1930; Oakland, California, U.S.
- Died: May 20, 2007 (aged 77); National City, California, U.S.
- Education: University of California, Berkeley; University of Chicago
- Known for: Abiogenesis
- Awards: Oparin Medal
- Scientific career
- Fields: Chemistry
- Workplaces: University of Chicago; Columbia University; University of California, San Diego
- Doctoral advisor: Harold Urey
- Doctoral students: Jeffrey Bada

Stanley Lloyd Miller (March 7, 1930 – May 20, 2007) was an American chemist who made a wide range of experiments, demonstrating that select organic compounds can be synthesized by chemical processes from inorganic substances. In 1952 he performed the Miller–Urey experiment, which showed that complex organic molecules could be synthesised from inorganic precursors. The experiment was widely reported.

== Life and career ==
Stanley Miller was born in Oakland, California. He was the second child (after a brother, Donald) of Nathan and Edith Miller, descendants of Jewish immigrants from Belarus and Latvia. His father was an attorney and served as Oakland Deputy District Attorney in 1927. His mother was a school teacher so that education was a natural environment in the family. In fact, while in Oakland High School he was nicknamed "a chem whiz." He followed his brother to the University of California at Berkeley to study chemistry mainly because he felt that Donald would be able to help him with the topic. He completed his B.S. in June 1951. When his father died in 1946, his family experienced financial challenges. With help from Berkeley faculty members (Berkeley did not then grant research assistantships), he received a teaching assistantship at the University of Chicago in February 1951. Teaching would provide the basic funds for graduate work.

Miller enrolled in the University of Chicago PhD program in September 1951. He searched frantically for a thesis topic, met professors, and preferred theoretical problems rather than experiments, which tended to be laborious. He initially worked with the theoretical physicist Edward Teller on synthesis of elements. Conforming to the custom of the university, which was that graduate students attend seminars, he attended a chemistry seminar by Nobel laureate Harold Urey on the origin of solar system and the idea that organic synthesis was possible in a reducing environment, such as the primitive Earth's atmosphere. Miller was immensely inspired.

After a year of fruitless work with Teller, and the prospect of Teller's leaving Chicago to work on the hydrogen bomb, Urey approached Miller in September 1952 with a fresh research project. Urey was not immediately enthusiastic about Miller's interest in pre-biotic synthesis: no successful work had been done. Urey suggested that Miller work on thallium in meteorites. With persistence, Miller persuaded Urey to experiment with electric discharges in gases.

The experiments produced amino acids, the building blocks of life, in the reaction vessel. Urey or Miller was afraid that specks of fly excrement might be the source of the amino acids (or was so chided by classmates). Excrement was not the source; the result was a demonstration that "organic" chemical compounds could be produced by purely inorganic processes. Miller earned a doctorate in 1954, and a long-lasting reputation. From spectroscopic observations of stars, it is now well known that complex organic compounds form from the gases of carbon-rich stars. The fundamental issue, the connection between "pre-biotic organic" compounds and the origin of life, has remained.

After completing a doctorate, Miller was a F. B. Jewett Fellow at the California Institute of Technology in 1954 and 1955. There, he worked on the mechanism involved in the synthesis of amino and hydroxycarboxylic acids. He then joined the Department of Biochemistry at the College of Physicians and Surgeons at Columbia University, where he worked for the next five years. When the new University of California at San Diego was established, he became the first assistant professor of the Department of Chemistry in 1960, and an associate professor in 1962, and then a full Professor in 1968.

He supervised 8 PhD students including Jeffrey L. Bada. He also co-authored the book "The Origin of Life on Earth."

== Miller's experiment ==
The Miller experiment was described in his technical paper in the May 15, 1953, issue of Science, which transformed the concept of scientific ideas concerning the origin of life into a respectable empirical inquiry. His study has become a classic textbook definition of the scientific basis of origin of life, or more specifically, the first definitive experimental evidence of the Oparin and Haldane's "primordial soup" theory. Urey and Miller designed to simulate the ocean-atmospheric condition of the primitive Earth by using a continuous stream of steam into a mixture of methane (CH_{4}), ammonia (NH_{3}), and hydrogen (H_{2}). The gaseous mixture was then exposed to electrical discharge, which induced chemical reaction. After a week of reaction, Miller detected the formation of amino acids, such as glycine, α- and β-alanine, using paper chromatography. He also detected aspartic acid and gamma-amino butyric acid, but was not confident about them. Since amino acids are the basic structural and functional constituents of cellular life, the experiment showed the possibility of natural organic synthesis for the origin of life on earth.

=== Publication problem ===
Miller showed his results to Urey, who suggested immediate publication. Urey refused to be the co-author lest Miller receive little or no credit. The manuscript with Miller as the sole author was submitted to the magazine Science on February 10, 1953. After waiting several weeks, Urey inquired and wrote to the chairman of the editorial board on February 27 on the lack of action in reviewing the manuscript. A month passed, but still there was no decision. On March 10 the infuriated Urey demanded the manuscript to be returned, and he himself submitted it to the Journal of the American Chemical Society on March 13. By then, the editor of Science, apparently annoyed by Urey's insinuation, wrote directly to Miller that the manuscript was to be published. Miller then withdrew the manuscript from the Journal of the American Chemical Society.

=== Follow-up ===
Miller continued his research until his death in 2007. As the knowledge of the Earth's early atmosphere progressed, and techniques for chemical analyses improved, he continued to refine the details and methods. He succeeded not only in synthesizing more and more varieties of amino acids, he also produced a wide variety of inorganic and organic compounds essential for cellular construction and metabolism. In support, a number of independent researchers also confirmed the range of chemical syntheses. With the recent revelation that, unlike the original Miller's experimental hypothesis of a strongly reducing condition, the primitive atmosphere could have been quite neutral, containing other gases in different proportions. Miller's last works, published posthumously in 2008, still succeeded in synthesizing an array of organic compounds using such conditions.

== Reassessment ==
In 1972 Miller and his collaborators repeated the 1953 experiment, but with newly developed automatic chemical analysers, such as ion-exchange chromatography and gas chromatography-mass spectrometry. They synthesized 33 amino acids, including 10 that are known to occur naturally in organisms. These included all of the primary alpha-amino acids found in the Murchison meteorite, which fell on Australia in 1969. A subsequent electric discharge experiment actually produced more variety of amino acids than that in the meteorite.

Just before Miller's death, several boxes containing vials of dried residues were found among his laboratory materials in the university. A note indicated that some were from his original 1952-1954 experiments, produced by using three different apparatuses, and one from 1958, which included hydrogen sulphide (H_{2}S) in the gaseous mixture for the first time, a result which was never published. In 2008 his students re-analysed the 1952 samples using more sensitive techniques, such as high-performance liquid chromatography and liquid chromatography–time of flight mass spectrometry. Their result showed the synthesis of 22 amino acids and 5 amines, revealing that the original Miller experiment produced many more compounds than actually reported in 1953. The unreported 1958 samples were analysed in 2011, from which 23 amino acids and 4 amines, including 7 sulfurous compounds, were detected.

== Death ==
Miller suffered a series of strokes beginning in November 1999 that increasingly inhibited his physical activity. He was living in a nursing home in National City, south of San Diego, and died on May 20, 2007, at the nearby Paradise Hospital. He was survived by his brother Donald and his family, and his partner Maria Morris.

== Honors and recognitions ==
Miller is remembered for his work concerning the origin of life (and he was considered a pioneer of the topics of exobiology), the natural occurrence of clathrate hydrates, and general mechanisms of action of anaesthesia. He was elected to the US National Academy of Sciences in 1973. He was an Honorary Counselor of Spain's Higher Council for Scientific Research in 1973. He was awarded the Oparin Medal by the International Society for the Study of the Origin of Life in 1983, and served as its president from 1986 to 1989.

He was nominated for Nobel Prize more than once during his life.

The Stanley L. Miller Award for scientists younger than the age of 37 was instituted by the International Society for the Study of the Origin of Life in 2008.

== See also ==
- Abiogenesis
- Alexander Oparin
- Biochemistry
- Microsphere
- Proteinoid
- Sidney W. Fox
- Antonio Lazcano
- Joan Oró
