= Proteinoid =

Proteinoids, or thermal proteins, are protein-like, often cross-linked molecules formed abiotically from amino acids. Sidney W. Fox initially proposed that they may have been precursors to the first living cells (protocells). The term was also used in the 1960s to describe peptides that are shorter than twenty amino acids found in hydrolysed protein, but this term is no longer commonly used.

== History ==
In trying to uncover the intermediate stages of abiogenesis, scientist Sidney W. Fox in the 1950s and 1960s, studied the spontaneous formation of peptide structures under conditions that might plausibly have existed early in Earth's history. He demonstrated that amino acids could spontaneously form small chains called peptides. In one of his experiments, he allowed amino acids to dry out as if puddled in a warm, dry spot in prebiotic conditions. He found that, as they dried, the amino acids formed long, often cross-linked, thread-like microscopic polypeptide globules, he named "proteinoid microspheres".

== Polymerization ==
The abiotic polymerization of amino acids into proteins through the formation of peptide bonds was thought to occur only at temperatures over 140 °C. However, the biochemist Sidney Walter Fox and his co-workers discovered that phosphoric acid acted as a catalyst for this reaction. They were able to form protein-like chains from a mixture of 18 common amino acids at 70 °C in the presence of phosphoric acid, and dubbed these protein-like chains proteinoids. Fox later found naturally occurring proteinoids similar to those he had created in his laboratory in lava and cinders from Hawaiian volcanic vents and determined that the amino acids present polymerized due to the heat of escaping gases and lava. Other catalysts have since been found; one of them, amidinium carbodiimide, is formed in primitive Earth experiments and is effective in dilute aqueous solutions.

When present in certain concentrations in aqueous solutions, proteinoids form small microspheres. This is because some of the amino acids incorporated into proteinoid chains are more hydrophobic than others, and so proteinoids cluster together like droplets of oil in water. These structures exhibit a few characteristics of living cells:

1. An outer wall.
2. Osmotic swelling and shrinking.
3. Budding.
4. Binary fission (dividing into two daughter microspheres).
5. Streaming movement of internal particles.

Fox thought that the microspheres may have provided a cell compartment within which organic molecules could have become concentrated and protected from the outside environment during the process of chemical evolution.

Proteinoid microspheres are today being considered for use in pharmaceuticals, providing microscopic biodegradable capsules in which to package and deliver oral drugs.

In another experiment using a similar method to set suitable conditions for life to form, Fox collected volcanic material from a cinder cone in Hawaii. He discovered that the temperature was over 100 °C (212 °F) just 4 inches (100 mm) beneath the surface of the cinder cone, and suggested that this might have been the environment in which life was created—molecules could have formed and then been washed through the loose volcanic ash and into the sea. He placed lumps of lava over amino acids derived from methane, ammonia and water, sterilized all materials, and baked the lava over the amino acids for a few hours in a glass oven. A brown, sticky substance formed over the surface and when the lava was drenched in sterilized water a thick, brown liquid leached out. It turned out that the amino acids had combined to form proteinoids, and the proteinoids had combined to form small spheres. Fox called these "microspheres". His protobionts were not cells, although they formed clumps and chains reminiscent of bacteria. Based upon such experiments, Colin Pittendrigh stated in December 1967 that "laboratories will be creating a living cell within ten years," a remark that reflected the typical contemporary levels of ignorance of the complexity of cell structures.

== Legacy ==
Fox has likened the amino acid globules to cells, and proposed it bridged the macromolecule to cell transition. However, his hypothesis was later dismissed as proteinoids are not proteins, they feature mostly non-peptide bonds and amino acid cross-linkages not present in living organisms. Furthermore, they have no compartmentalization and there is no information content in the molecules.

Although their role as an evolutionary precursor has been superseded, the hypothesis was a catalyst to further investigate other mechanisms that could have brought about abiogenesis, such as the RNA world, PAH world, Iron–sulfur world, and protocell hypotheses.

== See also ==
- Abiogenesis
- Jeewanu
- Protocell
- Proto-mitochondrion
