= Bio-like structure =

Bio-like structures were claimed to be a form of synthetic life obtained by the Soviet microbiologist V. O. Kalinenko in distilled water, as well as on an agar gel, under the influence of an electric field. However, these entities are most likely non-living inorganic structures.

== Description ==
The original idea behind the experiments was a consequence of Kalinenko's observations made during an expedition studying microorganisms that live at the bottom of sea and ocean waters. It was assumed that test samples were not contaminated, since the experiments were carried out in sterile laboratory conditions and the formed structures did not resemble microorganisms currently known to science. Kalinenko described the process as the creation of life forms from inanimate matter—water, air, and electricity. The structures were reported to have various amoeba-like shapes, resembling discs, cigars and caudate rockets. They seemingly possessed the basic characteristics of living organisms in that they could move, grow and multiply, and cell "nuclei" were observed, which, similarly to naturally occurring nuclei, contained "chromosomes". Some "amoebas" turned out to be "predators" that could envelop and then digest their "victims". Moreover, Kalinenko argued the structures exhibited enzymatic activity by dissolving calcite and magnesite crystals; therefore, it might be concluded that they were not minerals themselves. Kalinenko did not give the structures a formal name; instead, he referred to them as "bio-like structures", "biostructures" and "artificial cells". As evidence to support his claims, Kalinenko presented numerous photographs showing the various stages of the formation and development of "biostructures". Kalinenko termed the process of the synthesis of these structures as "energobiosis" and claimed that the method he described might also be used to synthesize protein-based cells.

== Scientific reviews ==
The structures have been described by Kalinenko as "living" microorganisms; however, his statements have been called into question. A review study carried out in a laboratory concluded that these structures lack proteins, amino acids, nucleic acids (and their precursors, purine and pyrimidine bases), and adenosine triphosphate; that is, they "contain no important compounds necessary for all known organisms" and therefore "cannot be regarded as living structures". Although it has been actually found that some of the structures produced by Kalinenko slightly resembled bacteria or amoebas in their shape and form, the group of workers did not detect any microorganisms in the samples. However, a possibility that the described process may have something to do with the origin of life on Earth has not been completely ruled out. Scientists have not explicitly stated what "biostructures" truly are, but it has been suggested that they probably consist of inorganic salts. Kalinenko's striking declaration that "biostructures" are living units met with bewilderment and skepticism among biologists of the USSR Academy of Sciences. It has been implied that the conclusions Kalinenko drew resulted from his lack of a critical attitude towards the data, as it seemed impossible to create a cell under the described conditions; there were also those who were more sharply critical of him. According to NASA researchers, "presently known scientific principles of biology and biochemistry" cannot allow inorganic entities to be considered alive, and "the postulated existence" of such entities "has not been proved" as no confirmatory reports by other scientists exist.

== See also ==
- Jeewanu
- Protocell
