= David Matsumoto =

American psychologist (born 1959)

David Matsumoto (born August 2, 1959) is an American author, psychologist and judoka. His areas of expertise include culture, emotion, facial expressions, nonverbal behavior and microexpressions. He has published over 400 articles, manuscripts, book chapters and books on these subjects. Matsumoto is a professor at San Francisco State University and also the director of Humintell - a company that provides "unique training in the fields of facial expression of emotion, nonverbal behavior, detecting deception and cultural adaptation." In addition, he is an 8th degree black belt in judo and the founder and program advisor of the East Bay Judo Institute in El Cerrito, California. He was most recently inducted into the 2021 United States Judo Federation (USJF) Hall of Fame which acknowledges outstanding judoka who have made significant contributions to the sport of judo.

== Academics ==
Matsumoto was born and raised in Honolulu, Hawaii. He received his B.A. from the University of Michigan at Ann Arbor in 1981 with high honors in psychology and Japanese. Matsumoto proceeded to obtain his master's degree and doctorate degrees in psychology from the University of California at Berkeley in 1983 and 1986, respectively.

Since 1989, Matsumoto has been a professor of psychology at San Francisco State University, where he received a distinguished faculty award in 2009.

He is also the founder and director of the Culture and Emotion Research Laboratory (CERL) at San Francisco State.

In January 2009, Matsumoto received a $1.9 million Minerva Award research grant from the US Department of Defense to examine the role of emotions in ideologically based groups.

Most recently in 2018 Matsumoto was San Francisco State University's nominee for the Jefferson Award for Public Service. This award recognizes people who make a difference on a daily basis in their local communities without expectation of reward.

== Psychology ==
Matsumoto has collaborated with many other psychologists, including Dr. Paul Ekman and Dr. Mark Frank, both acclaimed psychologists in the study of facial expressions and emotions.

In addition to conducting extensive research, Matsumoto, Ekman and Frank created the Microexpression Training Tool (METT1), the first training tool developed to improve one's ability to read microexpressions. Ekman and Matsumoto then proceeded to create a proceeding version of the training tool, METT2.

Both Matsumoto and Ekman now have their own versions of the microexpression training tool, which is available on their websites.

In 2009, Matsumoto and Bob Willingham conducted a study examining spontaneous facial expressions in blind judo athletes. They discovered that many facial expressions are innate and not visually learned.

Matsumoto says that "Spontaneously produced facial expressions of emotion of both congenitally and non-congenitally blind individuals are the same as for sighted individuals in the same emotionally evocative situations. We also see that blind athletes manage their expressions in social situations the same way sighted athletes do."

Their study received much publicity and critical acclaim, including coverage in Time magazine and on CNN.

== Judo ==
Matsumoto is the founder and program director of the East Bay Judo Institute located in El Cerrito, California. In addition, he has served as an official researcher for the International Judo Federation as well as past director of development for USA Judo. He holds Class A Coaching and Referee licenses.

Matsumoto has won countless awards, including the US Olympic Committee’s Coach of the Year Award for Judo in 2003. In addition to holding various positions within the United States Judo Federation and USA Judo, Matsumoto served as the head coach of the 1996 Atlanta Olympic judo team and was the team leader for the 2000 Sydney Olympic judo team.

His students have distinguished themselves by obtaining medals in national and international competition over 200 times in the past 20 years, including a silver medal at the 2000 World Junior Judo Championships by his daughter, 2008 Olympian, Sayaka Matsumoto.

== Books ==
Matsumoto is the author of numerous books, including:

- Nonverbal Communication Science and Applications (2013)
- The Thrill of Victory and the Agony of Defeat (2007)
- Culture and Psychology-4th Edition (2007)
- Judo in the U.S.: A Century of Dedication (2005)
- The New Japan: Debunking Seven Cultural Stereotypes (2002)
- The Handbook of Culture and Psychology (2001)
- のあともう一言：話が弾む英会話 (2000)
- 日本人の国際適応力 (1999)
- Judo: A Sport and a Way of Life (1999)
- これだけ！トラベル英会話 (1999)
- これで通じる！一言英会話 (1998)
- Culture and Modern Life (1997)
- 日本人の感情世界 (1996)
- Introduction to Kodokan Judo: History and Philosophy (1996)
- Unmasking Japan: Myths and Realities about the Emotions of the Japanese (1996)
- Cultural Influences on Research Methods and Statistics (1994)
- People: Psychology From a Cultural Perspective (1994)

== See also ==
- Body language
- Emotion classification
- Emotions and Culture
- Microexpression
- Nonverbal communication
