= Microexpression =

Innate result of emotional responses

Microexpressions of emotions (in order: surprise, fear/shock, sadness, anger, happiness and disgust)

A microexpression is a facial expression with very short duration. It is the innate result of a voluntary and an involuntary emotional response occurring simultaneously and conflicting with one another. It occurs when the amygdala responds appropriately to the stimuli that the individual experiences and wishes to conceal this specific emotion. This results in briefly displaying their true emotions followed by a false emotional reaction.

Human emotions are an unconscious biopsychosocial reaction that derives from the amygdala, and they typically last 0.5–4.0 seconds, although a microexpression will typically last less than 1/2 of a second. It is either very difficult or virtually impossible to hide microexpression reactions. Microexpressions cannot be controlled, but it is possible to capture someone's expressions with a high-speed camera and replay them at much slower speeds. Microexpressions express the seven universal emotions: disgust, anger, fear, sadness, happiness, contempt, and surprise. In the 1990s, Paul Ekman expanded his list of emotions, including a range of positive and negative emotions not all of which are encoded in facial muscles. These emotions are amusement, embarrassment, anxiety, guilt, pride, relief, contentment, pleasure, and shame.

== History ==
Microexpressions were first discovered by Haggard and Isaacs. In their 1966 study, Haggard and Isaacs outlined how they discovered these "micromomentary" expressions while "scanning motion picture films of psychotherapy for hours, searching for indications of non-verbal communication between therapist and patient". Through a series of studies, Paul Ekman found a high agreement across members of diverse Western and Eastern literate cultures on selecting emotional labels that fit facial expressions. Expressions he found to be universal included those indicating anger, disgust, fear, happiness, sadness, and surprise. Findings on contempt are less clear, though there is at least some preliminary evidence that this emotion and its expression are universally recognized. Working with his long-time friend Wallace V. Friesen, Ekman demonstrated that the findings extended to preliterate Fore tribesmen in Papua New Guinea, whose members could not have learned the meaning of expressions from exposure to media depictions of emotion. Ekman and Friesen then demonstrated that certain emotions were exhibited with very specific display rules, culture-specific prescriptions about who can show which emotions to whom and when. These display rules could explain how cultural differences may conceal the universal effect of expression.

In the 1960s, William S. Condon pioneered the study of interactions at the fraction-of-a-second level. In his famous research project, he scrutinized a four-and-a-half-second film segment frame by frame, where each frame represented 1/25th second. After studying this film segment for a year and a half, he discerned interactional micromovements, such as the wife moving her shoulder exactly as the husband's hands came up, which combined yielded rhythms at the micro level.

Years after Condon's study, American psychologist John Gottman began video-recording living relationships to study how couples interact. By studying participants' facial expressions, Gottman was able to correlate expressions with which relationships would last and which would not. Gottman's 2002 paper makes no claims to accuracy in terms of binary classification, and is instead a regression analysis of a two factor model where skin conductance levels and oral history narratives encodings are the only two statistically significant variables. Facial expressions using Ekman's encoding scheme were not statistically significant. In Canadian journalist Malcolm Gladwell's book Blink, Gottman states that there are four major emotional reactions that are destructive to a marriage: defensiveness which is described as a reaction toward a stimulus as if you were being attacked, stonewalling which is the behavior where a person refuses to communicate or cooperate with another, criticism which is the practice of judging the merits and faults of a person, and contempt which is a general attitude that is a mixture of the primary emotions disgust and anger. Among these four, Gottman considers contempt the most important of them all.

== Types ==
Microexpressions are typically classified based on how an expression is modified. They exist in three groups:

- Simulated expressions: when a microexpression is not accompanied by a genuine emotion. This is the most commonly studied form of microexpression because of its nature. It occurs when there is a brief flash of an expression and then returns to a neutral state.
- Neutralized expressions: when a genuine expression is suppressed and the face remains neutral. This type of microexpression is not observable due to the successful suppression of it by a person.
- Masked expressions: when a genuine expression is completely masked by a falsified expression. Masked expressions are microexpressions that are intended to be hidden, either subconsciously or consciously.

== In photographs and films ==
Microexpressions can be difficult to recognize, but still images and video can make them easier to perceive. In order to learn how to recognize the way that various emotions register across parts of the face, Ekman and Friesen recommend the study of what they call "facial blueprint photographs", photographic studies of "the same person showing all the emotions" under consistent photographic conditions. However, because of their extremely short duration, by definition, microexpressions can happen too quickly to capture with traditional photography. Both Condon and Gottman compiled their seminal research by intensively reviewing film footage. Frame rate manipulation also allows the viewer to distinguish distinct emotions, as well as their stages and progressions, which would otherwise be too subtle to identify. This technique is demonstrated in the short film Thought Moments by Michael Simon Toon and a film in Malayalam Pretham 2016 Paul Ekman also has materials he has created on his website that teach people how to identify microexpressions using various photographs, including photos he took during his research period in New Guinea.

== Moods vs emotions ==
Moods differ from emotions in that the feelings involved last over a longer period. For example, a feeling of anger lasting for just a few minutes, or even for an hour, is called an emotion. But if the person remains angry all day, or becomes angry a dozen times during that day, or is angry for days, then it is a mood. Many people describe this as a person being irritable, or that the person is in an angry mood. As Paul Ekman described, it is possible but unlikely for a person in this mood to show a complete anger facial expression. More often just a trace of that angry facial expression may be held over a considerable period: a tightened jaw or tensed lower eyelid, or a lip pressed against a lip, or brows drawn down and together. Emotions are defined as a complex pattern of changes, including physiological arousal, feelings, cognitive processes, and behavioral reactions, made in response to a situation perceived to be personally significant.

== Controlled microexpressions ==
Facial expressions are not just automatic reflexes. Some may be voluntary and others involuntary, and thus some may be truthful and others false or misleading. Some people are born able to control their expressions, while others are trained, such as actors. "Natural liars" may be aware of their ability to control microexpressions, and so may those who know them well; they may have been able to "get away" with things since childhood due to greater ease in fooling their parents, teachers, and friends. People can simulate emotion expressions, attempting to create the impression that they feel an emotion when they are not experiencing it at all. A person may show an expression that looks like fear when in fact they feel nothing, or perhaps some other emotion. Facial expressions of emotion are controlled for various reasons, whether cultural or by social conventions. For example, in the United States many young men learn the cultural display rule, "Boys do not cry or look afraid". There are also more personal display rules, not learned by most people within a culture but the product of the idiosyncrasies of a particular family. A child may be taught never to look angrily at his father or never to show sadness when disappointed. These display rules, whether cultural ones shared by most people or personal, individual ones, are usually so well-learned, and learned so early, that the control of the facial expression they dictate is done automatically without thinking or awareness.

== Emotional intelligence ==
Involuntary facial expressions can be hard to pick up and understand explicitly, and they are more of an implicit competence of the unconscious mind. Daniel Goleman created a conclusion on the capacity of an individual to recognize their own, as well as others', emotions, and to discriminate emotions based on introspection of those feelings. This is part of Goleman's emotional intelligence. In E.I, attunement is an unconscious synchrony that guides empathy. Attunement relies heavily on nonverbal communication. Looping is where facial expressions can elicit involuntary behavior. In the research on motor mimicry there are neurons that pick up on facial expressions and communicate with motor neurons responsible for muscles in the face to display the same facial expression. Thus, displaying a smile may elicit a microexpression of a smile on someone who is trying to remain neutral in their expression.

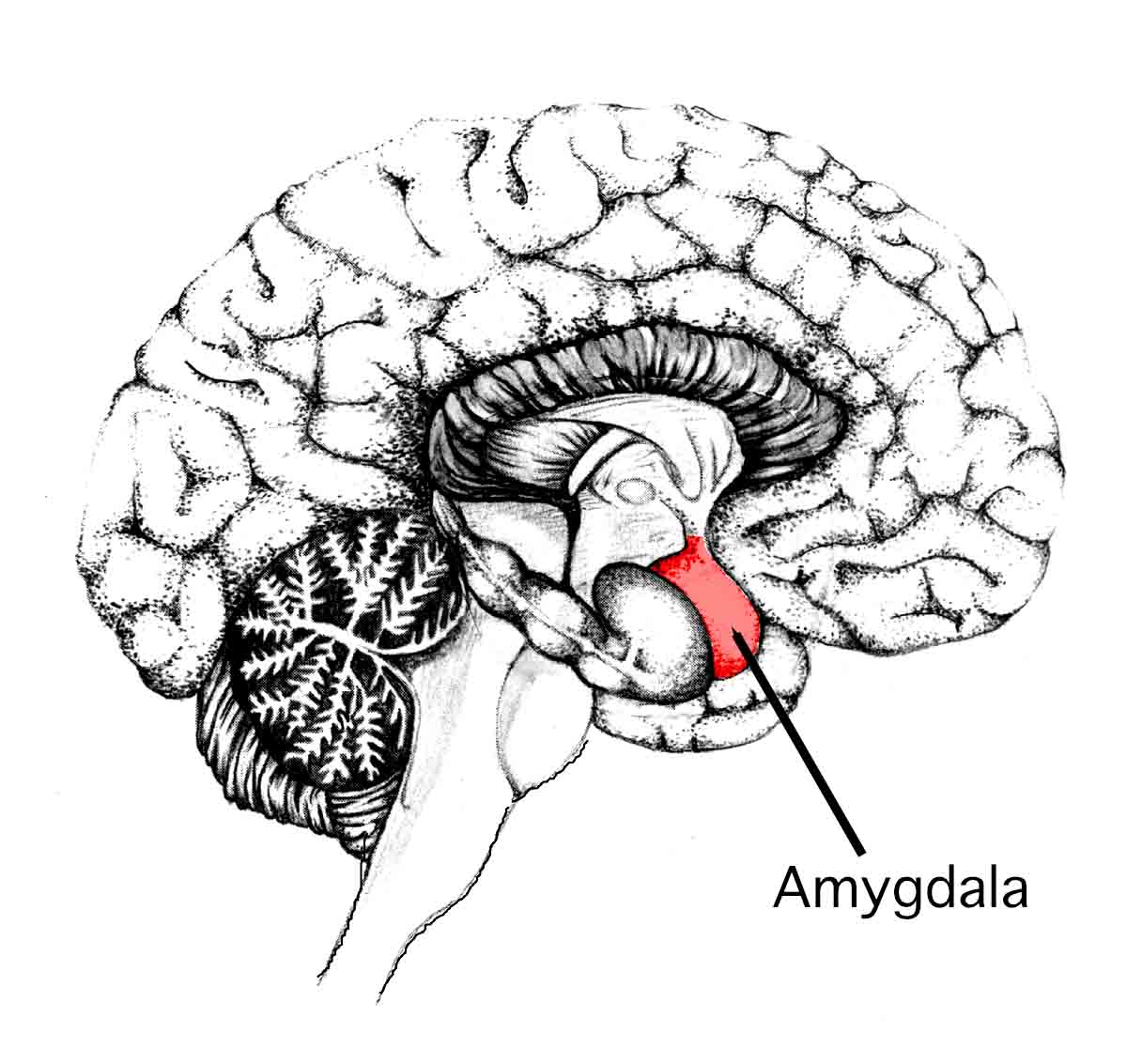
The amygdala is the emotion center of the brain.

Through fMRI we can see the area where these Mirror neurons are located lights up when you show the subject an image of a face expressing an emotion using a mirror. In the relationship of the prefrontal cortex, also known as the executive mind, which is where cognitive thinking experiences occur, and the amygdala, being part of the limbic system, is responsible for involuntary functions, habits, and emotions. The amygdala can hijack the pre-frontal cortex in a sympathetic response. In his book Emotional Intelligence Goleman uses the case of Jason Haffizulla (who assaulted his high school physics teacher because of a grade he received on a test) as an example of an emotional hijacking in which rationality and better judgement can be impaired. This is one example of how the bottom brain can interpret sensory memory and execute involuntary behavior. This is the purpose of microexpressions in attunement and how you can interpret the emotion that is shown in a fraction of a second. The microexpression of a concealed emotion that's displayed to an individual will elicit the same emotion in them to a degree; this process is referred to as an emotional contagion.

== MFETT and SFETT ==
Micro facial expression training tools (MFETT) and subtle facial expression training tools (SFETT) are types of software made to develop someone's skills in recognizing emotion. These tools utilize an instructive video on the topic, followed by videos of faces to be analysed for practice, with feedback provided immediately. These tools are often used for people that find daily social situations difficult, such as people with autism. The positive feedback is thought to reinforce the association between the presented face and what it conveys, leading to improvements in emotion recognition.

These tools, along with other training methods, have been found to improve accuracy in detecting deception. According to a pair of studies, the average person has around a 54% accuracy rate in lie detection, while secret service agents have an average of 64%. However, training is not the only factor shown to have an effect. In a later study by Ekman, a cohort of participants that all had specific interest in microexpressions as a method for lie detection, had accuracy rates ranging from 68% to 73%. It was concluded from their results that this variation, when level of training was controlled for, was due to individual differences in emotional intelligence.

== Lies and leakage ==
The sympathetic nervous system is one of two divisions under the autonomic nervous system, it functions involuntarily and one aspect of the system deals with emotional arousal in response to situations accordingly. Therefore, if an individual decides to deceive someone, they will experience a stress response within because of the possible consequences if caught. A person using deception will typically cope by using nonverbal cues, which take the form of bodily movements. These bodily movements occur because of the need to release the chemical buildup of cortisol, which is produced at a higher rate in a situation where there is something at stake. The purpose for these involuntary nonverbal cues are to ease oneself in a stressful situation. In the midst of deceiving an individual, leakage can occur, which is when nonverbal cues are exhibited and are contradictory to what the individual is conveying. Despite this useful tactic of detecting deception, microexpressions do not show what intentions or thoughts the deceiver is trying to conceal. They only provide the fact that there was emotional arousal in the context of the situation. If an individual displays fear or surprise in the form of a microexpression, it does not mean that the individual is concealing information that is relevant to the investigation. This is similar to how polygraphs fail to some degree: because there is a sympathetic response due to the fear of being disbelieved as innocent. The same goes for microexpressions: when there is a concealed emotion, there is no information revealed on why that emotion was felt. They do not determine a lie, but are a form of detecting concealed information. David Matsumoto is a well-known American psychologist and explains that one must not conclude that someone is lying if a microexpression is detected but that there is more to the story than is being told. Matsumoto was also the first to publish scientific evidence that microexpressions may be a key to detecting deception.

Despite the prevailing belief among law enforcement and the public that microexpressions are able to reveal whether a person is being deceitful, there is a lack of empirical evidence to support this claim. Research has shown that there is often a disconnect between displayed emotions and felt emotions; in short, deception does not necessarily produce negative emotions and negative emotions do not necessarily signal deception. In addition, microexpressions do not occur often enough to be useful. In one of the few studies of microexpressions, researchers found that only 2% of emotional expressions coded could be considered microexpressions and they appeared equally for truth-tellers and liars. Other studies have found that liars and truth-tellers exhibit different responses than expected: in a concealed information test, Pentland and colleagues found that liars showed less contempt and more intense smiles than truthful people. This counters the fundamental idea behind microexpressions, which suggests that it is impossible for a liar to conceal their true nature, as evidence of their guilt "leaks" out through these expressions. Taken together, their findings suggest that microexpressions do not occur frequently enough to be detectable, neither are they consistent enough to distinguish liars from truth-tellers.

== Universality ==
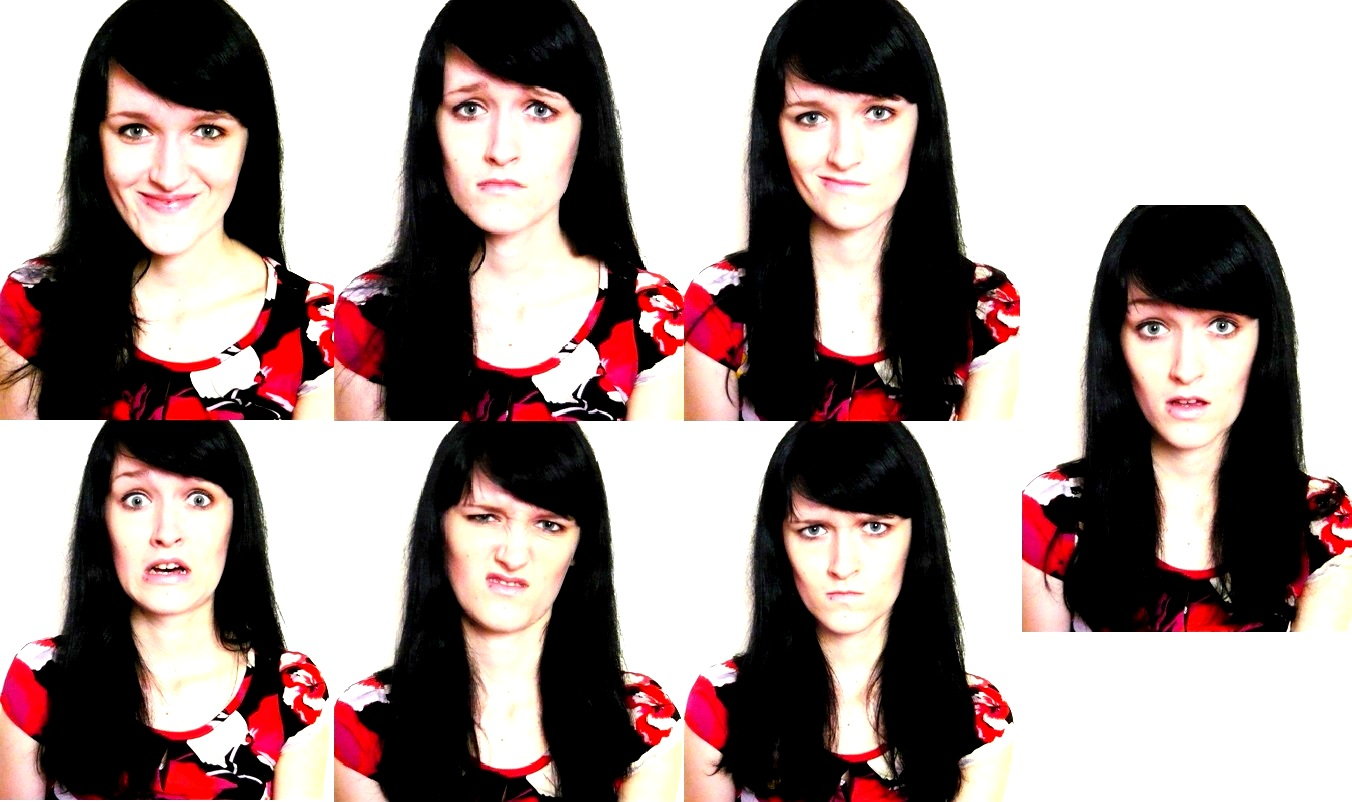
Universal facial expressions

A significant amount of research has been done in respect to whether basic facial expressions are universal or are culturally distinct. After Charles Darwin had written The Expression of the Emotions in Man and Animals it was widely accepted that facial expressions of emotion are universal and biologically determined. Many writers have disagreed with this statement. However, David Matsumoto agreed with this statement in his study of sighted and blind Olympians. Using thousands of photographs captured at the 2004 Olympic and Paralympic Games, Matsumoto compared the facial expressions of sighted and blind judo athletes, including individuals who were born blind. All competitors displayed the same expressions in response to winning and losing. Matsumoto discovered that both blind and sighted competitors displayed similar facial expressions, during winning and losing. These results suggest that our ability to modify our faces to fit the social setting is not learned visually. Matsumoto also has training tools he has created on his website that teaches people how to identify micro and subtle facial expressions of emotion.

== In popular culture ==
Microexpressions and associated science are the central premise for the 2009 television series Lie to Me, based on discoveries of Paul Ekman. The main character uses his acute awareness of microexpressions and other body language clues to determine when someone is lying or hiding something.

They also play a central role in Robert Ludlum's posthumously published The Ambler Warning, in which the central character, Harrison Ambler, is an intelligence agent able to recognize them. Similarly, one of the main characters in Alastair Reynolds' science fiction novel, Absolution Gap, Aura, can easily read microexpressions.

In The Mentalist, the main character, Patrick Jane, can often tell when people are being dishonest. However, specific reference to microexpressions is only made once in the 7th and final season.

In the 2015 science fiction thriller Ex Machina, Ava, an artificially intelligent humanoid, surprises the protagonist, Caleb, in their first meeting, when she tells him, "Your microexpressions are telegraphing discomfort."

== Controversy ==
Though the study of microexpressions has gained popularity through popular media, studies show it lacks internal consistency in its conceptual formation.

Maria Hartwig, professor of Psychology at John Jay College of Criminal Justice, argues that it has led to wrongful imprisonment of suspects who were aggressively interrogated due to perceived microexpressions.

A 2016 article in Scientific Reports explains that it is possible to mask involuntary expressions with fake expressions, and that in real world situations, over 40% of the time humans cannot tell the difference.

Judee K. Burgoon argues in a 2018 Frontiers in Psychology opinion that microexpression theory presumes that people feel detectable emotions always connected to the same thoughts or motivations. But what if, for example, people feel happy rather than guilty about deceiving others? Burgoon also cites studies showing that microexpressions are rare:

In one of the very few investigations of microexpression frequency, Porter and ten Brinke (2008) coded 700 high-stakes genuine and falsified emotional expressions and found only 2% were microexpressions.

and that they seldom result in arrests when implemented at places like airports:

testimony to the U.S. Congress revealed that only 0.6% out of 61,000 passenger referrals to law enforcement in 2011 and 2012 resulted in arrests (U.S. Government Accountability Office, 2013)

== See also ==
- Interpersonal deception theory
- Nonverbal communication
- Microaggression
- Facecrime
- Silent Talker Lie Detector
- Tell (poker)
