= SpudCell =

Type of artificial cell

A SpudCell is a type of artificial cell claimed as partially capable of metabolism and assisted reproduction. The work was initially reported only as a preprint.

== History ==
The researchers reported SpudCell in a preprint published on July 1, 2026. Dr. Kate Adamala of the University of Minnesota Twin Cities, leader of the team that created SpudCells, had previously submitted a paper to Cell, but it was "rejected... after one reviewer said SpudCells were not real biology." John Glass of the J. Craig Venter Institute described their creation as "a landmark event in the history of biology."

SpudCells were so named as an homage to Sputnik, the first artificial satellite, as well as in reference to their "potato-like appearance."

== Description ==
SpudCells have a genome of only 36 genes. Some of the genetic material came from E. coli, while other parts came from DNA viruses T7 and Phi29. The cells were created in a "soup" (growth medium) containing biological molecules, to which "the building blocks of membranes" were added; these enclosed some of the soup, in some cases containing the right mix to begin metabolic action. The researchers included genes associated with ribosomes production, but the system did not produce functional ribosomes. Ribosomes taken from E. coli, when added to the SpudCells, function for a time before ceasing. SpudCells can neither regulate their metabolisms nor eliminate waste.

SpudCells are also incapable of dividing on their own. Division has been accomplished in the lab by adding alpha-hemolysin, a pore-forming membrane protein, for single division events and the use of a mechanical separating mesh for subsequent ones. The researchers also conducted a competition experiment between genetically engineered SpudCell variants, that acquire food more efficiently and having them compete for the same food supply as the original strain. The engineered version comprised a greater quantity of SpudCells when the experiment was complete, suggesting the improved version was out-competing the original.

The researchers claimed that SpudCells could "feed, grow and replicate." The growth medium also contains nucleotide bases and liposomes which contain transfer RNA derived from E. coli, sugars, lipids, and enzymes. SpudCells divide using a mechanism that does not involve a cytoskeleton.

== Relationship to Biotic ==
Biotic is a U.S. nonprofit research organization focused on synthetic-cell engineering. Kate Adamala, whose laboratory at the University of Minnesota developed SpudCell, is a co-founder of Biotic. Biotic was established to develop further synthetic-cell engineering infrastructure based on the work on SpudCell. Biotic hosts the SpudCell preprint and related research materials on its website. Biotic states that it did not produce SpudCell.
