= Polymersome =

In biotechnology, polymersomes are a class of artificial vesicles, tiny hollow spheres that enclose a solution. Polymersomes are made using amphiphilic synthetic block copolymers to form the vesicle membrane, and have radii ranging from 50 nm to 5 μm or more. Most reported polymersomes contain an aqueous solution in their core and are useful for encapsulating and protecting sensitive molecules, such as drugs, enzymes, other proteins and peptides, and DNA and RNA fragments. The polymersome membrane provides a physical barrier that isolates the encapsulated material from external materials, such as those found in biological systems.

Synthosomes are polymersomes engineered to contain channels (transmembrane proteins) that allow certain chemicals to pass through the membrane, into or out of the vesicle. This allows for the collection or enzymatic modification of these substances.

The term "polymersome" for vesicles made from block copolymers was coined in 1999. Polymersomes are similar to liposomes, which are vesicles formed from naturally occurring lipids. While having many of the properties of natural liposomes, polymersomes exhibit increased stability and reduced permeability. Furthermore, the use of synthetic polymers enables designers to manipulate the characteristics of the membrane and thus control permeability, release rates, stability and other properties of the polymersome.

== Preparation ==
Several different morphologies of the block copolymer used to create the polymersome have been used. The most frequently used are the linear diblock or triblock copolymers. In these cases, the block copolymer has one block that is hydrophobic; the other block or blocks are hydrophilic. Other morphologies used include comb copolymers, where the backbone block is hydrophilic and the comb branches are hydrophobic, and dendronized block copolymers, where the dendrimer portion is hydrophilic.

In the case of diblock, comb and dendronized copolymers the polymersome membrane has the same bilayer morphology of a liposome, with the hydrophobic blocks of the two layers facing each other in the interior of the membrane. In the case of triblock copolymers the membrane is a monolayer that mimics a bilayer, the central block filling the role of the two facing hydrophobic blocks of a bilayer.

In general they can be prepared by the methods used in the preparation of liposomes. Film rehydration, direct injection method or dissolution method.

== Uses ==
Polymersomes that contain active enzymes and that provide a way to selectively transport substrates for conversion by those enzymes have been described as nanoreactors.

Polymersomes have been used to create controlled release drug delivery systems. Similar to coating liposomes with polyethylene glycol, polymersomes can be made invisible to the immune system if the hydrophilic block consists of polyethylene glycol. Their permeability can be modulated by exogenous factors, for example by incorporation of stimuli-responsive molecules such as photoswitches, or pH responsive groups. Thus, polymersomes are useful carriers for targeted drug delivery.

For in vivo applications, polymersomes are de facto limited to the use of FDA-approved polymers, as most pharmaceutical firms are unlikely to develop novel polymers due to cost issues. Fortunately, there are a number of such polymers available, with varying properties, including:

Hydrophilic blocks

- Poly(ethylene glycol) (PEG/PEO)
- Poly(2-methyloxazoline)

Hydrophobic blocks

- Polydimethylsiloxane (PDMS)
- Poly(caprolactone (PCL)
- Poly(lactide) (PLA)
- Poly(methyl methacrylate) (PMMA)

If enough of the block copolymer molecules that make up a polymersome are cross-linked, the polymersome can be made into a transportable powder.

Polymersomes can be used to make an artificial cell if hemoglobin and other components are added. The first artificial cell was made by Thomas Chang.

== See also ==
- Cell (biology)
- Liposome
- Polymer
- Copolymer
- Artificial cell
