= Michael Simon Toon =

British photographer (born 1977)

Michael Simon Toon (born 12 March 1977) is an English photographer, filmmaker, designer and builder.

== Short films ==
Toon has made two short films in the style of cinéma vérité which are globally recognised as serious inquiries into the nature of life:

Toon self-produced Thought Moments (2004) which examines microexpressions by slowing down footage of a wide range of individuals answering seemingly innocuous questions. Toon, a former Buddhist monk, titled Thought Moments after the Buddhist term for the mental states we experience when a physical or mental object enters the mind. The film is part of the British Film Council's library. It is also reproduced as coursework in neurolinguistic programming by students of psychology in several languages across the world.

Toon co-produced Protocell Circus (2010). He edited, treated, subtitled and scored footage of protocells synthesised and filmed by Dr. Rachel Armstrong, Senior TED Fellow and then University College London teaching fellow. The film appears in numerous discussions on the origin of life in terms of synthetic biology. It was exhibited in 2010 at Digital Art@Google NYC at the Chelsea Art Museum of Manhattan and at Synth-ethic: Art and Synthetic Biology Exhibition in 2011 at the Natural History Museum of Vienna, Austria.

== Career ==
Toon demonstrates a modernist, form follows function methodology of design and build with an 'ultra-modern' aesthetic and emphasis on environmental design.

=== Angels' House ===
Toon designed Angels' House, a 4,337 square foot energy efficient concept home in Weeford village, Lichfield of Staffordshire, England, which in 2008 sold for £2 million, then a record price for a single family home in Staffordshire, over twelve times the average. Toon formed Case Study Construction, referencing the Case Study House Program of Santa Monica, California, which from 1945 to 1966 commissioned and published plans for ideal homes by major designers of the day including Charles Eames and Mies van der Rohe. Angels' House sold while in construction based on computer generated images of the finished project.

=== Furniture ===
Toon has released four interior furnishing and architectural installation designs under the Si-Huis brand of the Los Angeles-based company California Design and Build, LLC.

- Sofa (2012)
- Bi-Plane Floor Lamp (2012)
- Cannon Pendant Lamp Shade (2012)
- Crane Light (2013)
