= Jeewanu =

Synthetic proto-cells model

Jeewanu (Sanskrit for "particles of life") are synthetic chemical particles that possess cell-like structure and seem to have some functional properties; that is, they are a model of primitive cells, or protocells. They were discovered in abiogenesis experiments conducted by an Indian chemist Krishna Bahadur and his wife S. Ranganayaki in 1963. Using a photochemical reaction, they produced coacervates, microscopic cell-like spheres from a mixture of simple organic and inorganic compounds.

Bahadur and Ranganayaki named these particles 'Jeewanu' because they exhibit some of the basic properties of a cell, such as the presence of semipermeable membrane, amino acids, phospholipids and carbohydrates. Further, like living cells, they had several catalytic activities. Further experiments including by independent researchers showed that Jeewanu can reproduce and incorporate nitrogenous bases, the raw materials for genetic system. Jeewanu are cited as models of protocells for the origin of life, and as artificial cells.

== Etymology ==
Jeewanu is derived from Sanskrit जीव jīvá, meaning "life", and अणु aṇu, meaning "smallest particle", or the "indivisible". In contemporary Hindi, jeewanu also means unicellular organisms such as bacteria. Krishna Bahadur (20 January 1926 — 5 August 1994) and S. Ranganayaki specifically used the term for a protocell that they discovered to represent the Indian philosophical tradition not only through the use of Sanskrit but also by inferring ideas on the origin of life from the Vedas. While employing the traditional Hindu philosophy, they attempted to incorporate the advances in cell biology to the concept of abiogenesis.

== Experiments ==
The three main structures phospholipids form in solution; the liposome (a closed bilayer), the micelle and the bilayer.

Krishna Bahadur, working at the University of Allahabad in Uttar Pradesh, India, was studying the chemistry of photosynthesis, a process by which plants produce amino acids by utilising sunlight. As reported in Nature, he exposed a mixture of paraformaldehyde, ferric chloride, potassium nitrate and water to a bright sunlight (at 18–23.5°C) for three days, and found that three amino acids were spontaneously formed, asparagine, aspartic acid and serine. At the time, the chemistry of life's origin was a major interest in science and photosynthetic reaction was hypothesised as one of the major processes for the formation of basic biomolecules like amino acids. In 1958, with his colleague L. Santamaria and wife S. Ranganayaki, Bahadur reported a successful the successful synthesis of different amino acids from a mixture of paraformaldehyde, using colloidal molybdenum oxide as a catalyst.

These artificial photosynthesis experiments laid down the seminal basis for Bahadur and Ranganayaki to produce Jeewanu, which was first reported in 1963 in an Indian journal, Vijnana Parishad Anusandhan Patrika. The detailed syntheses were published in 1964 in a series of articles in a German journal Zentrallblatt für Bakteriologie, Parasitenkunde, Infektionskrankheiten und Hygiene (later renamed International Journal of Medical Microbiology).

Their initial experiment consisted of a sterilised apparatus in which inorganic nitrogenous compounds (such as ammonium phosphate and ammonium molybdate) and organic compounds such as citric acid (C_{6}H_{8}O_{7}), paraformaldehyde (OH(CH_{2}O)_{n}H) and formaldehyde (CH_{2}O) for carbon sources were mixed with minerals commonly found in living cells. Inorganic substances such as colloidal ferric chloride or molybdenum compounds supposedly acted as cofactors and catalysts.

When the apparatus was exposed to sunlight for several days and constantly shaken, microscopic spherical particles were formed. The interesting features of these particles were that they were enclosed in a semipermeable membrane, like the typical cell membrane. Like living cells, they were reported to contain amino acids, phospholipid membrane and carbohydrates. In addition, they were claimed to have reproductive capability by budding, much like unicellular organisms, but did not grow on any bacterial culture medium. Bahadur reported that the Jeewanu exhibited various catalytic properties and produced their own peptides by metabolic reactions. Bahadur's later work on the Jeewanu also detected the presence of amino acids in peptide form and sugars in the form of ribose, deoxyribose, fructose and glucose, as well as nucleic acid bases (DNA and RNA building blocks) including adenine, guanine, cytosine, thymine and uracil. Bahadur also reported having detected ATPase-like and peroxidase-like activity. Bahadur stated that by using molybdenum as a cofactor, the Jeewanu showed capability of reversible photochemical electron transfer, and released a gas mixture of oxygen and hydrogen at a 1:2 ratio.

Bahadur and his team further reported that Jeewanu had internal structures like those of cell organelles. In another experiment, nitrogenous bases were formed inside the protocell that could be inhibited by antibiotics like tetracycline, indicating their biological characteristics.

== Independent experiments ==
Michael Harvey Briggs, an English biochemist working at the at the NASA's Jet Propulsion Laboratory at the California Institute of Technology, was impressed by Bahadur's discovery. He repeated the experiment using different combinations of chemicals and amino acids. Instead of sunlight, he used artificial light, a 500-watt bulb under which he kept the chemical mixture for four months. The chemical reactions produced microscopic spheres of 0.5 to 15 μm. Some of the spheres behaved as living cells, showing enzymatic activity and capable of reproduction by budding. In 1965, he reported his experiment as "a confirmation and extension of" Jeewanu.

In 1980, Parveen Tripathi and Vijay Shankar Tripath from the University of Allahabad reported that Jeewanu could produce complex organic acids including citric, oleic, fumaric and malonic acids. They also showed that the formation and growth of Jeewanu is decreased by addition of amines like p-phenylene diamine, p-nitroaniline, α-naphthylamine or β-naphthyl amine.

Since 2009, Vinod Kumar Gupta at the C.M.D. Post Graduate College, Bilaspur, India, had performed a series of modified experiments and claimed to have synthesised a variety of Jeewanu. His early experiment not only produced simple cell-like structures but also cellular entities having cytoplasmic structures and photoautotrophic (making food from sunlight) ability. In 2013 , he and R.K. Rai reported a synthesis of Jeewanu having size from 0.5 μ to 3.5 μ in diameter, growth from within, metabolic activities, and "the presence of RNA-like material". The authors stated that the RNA-like material detected in the Jeewanu protocells support the RNA world hypothesis.

In 2023, Nayan Chakraborty, a PhD scholar supervised by Shashi Thutupalli at the National Centre for Biological Sciences (NCBS) in Bengaluru, studied synthetic cells by preparing coacervates and produced tiny blue spheres that looked and behaved like cells. Inspired by the Jeewanu concept, they conducted further experiments using a mixture of formaldehyde, diammonium molybdate, ferrous sulfate and diammonium hydrogen phosphate, and used molybdenum salts as a catalyst. A three-year experiment showed that the protocell could self-reproduce, perform weak metabolism and self-organise into compartments. Although Chakraborty and Thutupalli did not claim that they have synthesised living cells, they said that the Jeewanu process could be a good explanation for the chemical origin of life under natural conditions.

== Reception ==
Bahadur's publications were ambivalently received, and the overall attention of the scientific community seemed limited since Bahadur and his co-workers reported that the Jeewanus are alive (a striking statement), the team changed the protocols frequently and documented them somewhat idiosyncratically. Bahadur defined "living units" as "[...] those which grow, multiply, and are metabolically active in a systematic, harmonious, and synchronized manner".

Then, NASA's Exobiology Division tasked two biologists in 1967 to review and evaluate the literature so far published by Bahadur (not to replicate the experiments) on the synthesis and characteristics of the Jeewanu. The two NASA biologists did not debate whether these three criteria are an adequate definition of life, but whether the Jeewanu satisfy these criteria. The NASA report concluded that "the evidence presented on these three points is on the whole unconvincing". The report also stated that the postulated existence of these living units has not been proved and "the nature and properties of the Jeewanu remains to be clarified." In 1976, P.V.M. Srinivasan crticized the Jeewanu experiment in Social Scientist: "Its scientific significance, however, is most dubious as it was synthesized from motley variety of organic compounds."

In the 1980s, the Hungarian chemist Tibor Gánti discussed the Jeewanu at length in his 'chemoton theory'—an abstract model of autocatalytic chemical reactions—published first in Hungarian and translated into English in 2003. In the context of self-organizing structures, Gánti considered the Jeewanu a promising model system to understand the origin and fundamentals of life, and one that had never received due attention. In 1997, he wrote: "[Bahadur's] works were disdained because of the simple technical methods applied, though it could not be excluded that in his experiments living systems were present."

In 2011, a German historian Mathias Grote made a systematic analysis of Bahadur's research and stated that the Jeewanu story pertains to concepts of life, its beginnings, as well as possible artificially created cells. He criticised NASA report for discrediting the Jeewanu concept saying that the report was "was fierce and probably influential" in dissuasion of further research. Commenting on the research development, Supriya Lamba at Amity University, Noida remarked in 2023: "The 'Jewanu combination' provides the best environment for a simple protocell like structure to self-assemble and organise." In 2026, Jyothish Madambikattil Sasi and Biju Dharmapalan at the at Garden City University, Bengaluru, reappraised Jeewanu in the light of new discoveries and works done at the National Centre for Biological Sciences, saying:

The emerging evidence does not mean that Jeewanu has been proven to be 'life'. Nor does it establish that Bahadur and Ranganayaki were correct in all their original claims... Perhaps the most profound lesson is that the first chapter of biology may have been written not in DNA, but in the language of elementary chemistry. And in returning to a forgotten experiment from Allahabad, modern science may be rediscovering one possible pathway by which that language began to resemble life.

== See also ==
- Abiogenesis
- Artificial cell
- Emergence
- Endocytosis
- Endosymbiotic theory
- Entropy and life
- Evolutionary developmental biology
- Last universal ancestor
- Lipid bilayer characterization
- Lipid bilayer phase behavior
- Model lipid bilayer
- Protocell Circus – a film
- Pseudo-panspermia

== Books ==
- "Synthesis of Jeewanu, the Protocell." Bahadur, Krishna. (In English) Ram Narain Lal Beni Prasad, New Katra, Allahabad-211002 (U.P) India. ASIN: B0007JHWU0 (1966)
- "Origin of Life: A Functional Approach." Bahadur K. and Ranganayaki S.Ram Narain Lal Beni Prasad, New Katra, Allahabad-211002(U.P), India, (1981)
