= Protocell Circus =

Protocell Circus (2010), produced by Dr. Rachel Armstrong and Michael Simon Toon, is the first film to show the recognizable lifelike behavior of laboratory-created protocells.

Armstrong synthesized and filmed the protocells of Protocell Circus at the laboratory of the Bartlett School of Architecture, University College London. Her research incorporates protocells in the development of self-repairing 'living' architecture. Armstrong and Dr. Martin Hanczyc of the University of Southern Denmark developed the Bütschli dynamic droplet system used to synthesize the oil-based cells shown in the film. Although they contain no genetic material, these protocells absorb fuel and react to their environment as well as each other, which among other factors contribute to the theory that this "model could be considered as a type of primitive life that could have been possible on the early Earth."

Toon edited, sound designed, and post-produced Armstrong's raw footage, emphasizing moments of seemingly lifelike motion and interaction among the reagents. He also wrote subtitles for the cells' interactions using simple anthropomorphic statements such as "I'm afraid", "I love you", and "I want to escape." The combination of images and subtitles have been variously interpreted, both as a reflection of the human need to see similarities to ourselves in even proto-biological systems, and the converse suggestion that human behavior is actually a complex reflection of the behavior of primordial chemistry.

== Featured exhibitions ==
- Future Human season (2010) British Film Institute, BFI Southbank, London
- Digital Art@Google NYC (2010) Chelsea Art Museum of Manhattan, New York City
- Synth-ethic: Art and Synthetic Biology Exhibition (2011) Natural History Museum of Vienna, Austria

== See also ==
- Abiogenesis
- Artificial cell
- Characteristics of life
- Primordial soup
- Synthetic biology
