= Thought Moments =

Thought Moments (2004) is an anthropological short film in the style of cinéma vérité by Michael Simon Toon. Toon, a former Buddhist monk, titled Thought Moments after the Buddhist term for the mental states we experience when a physical or mental object enters the mind. The film is used in the study of microexpressions, eye accessing cues, and the universality of facial expressions.

Toon (off camera) interviews a diverse sample of individuals in public places across the United Kingdom asking a set of ten simple but emotionally evocative questions. The film uses variable frame rates to highlight distinct emotions, as well as their sequence and timing, that each individual expresses within seconds or fractions of a second after being asked questions, such as "What do you love most?" "Are you happy or sad?" and "What are you afraid of?"

Consistency of composition, lighting, and contrast facilitates the analysis of both the differences and similarities of the interviewees' facial expressions. Toon also released a version of the film with superimposed theoretical eye accessing cue chart. Both versions are studied and reproduced by students of psychology in several languages.

== Exhibitions ==
- Film Directory of The British Council
- Thai Film Foundation 10th Annual Short Film and Video Festival
