= Hemoperfusion =

- MeSH: D006464

Hemoperfusion or hæmoperfusion (see spelling differences) is a method of filtering the blood extracorporeally (that is, outside the body) to remove a toxin. As with other extracorporeal methods, such as hemodialysis (HD), hemofiltration (HF), and hemodiafiltration (HDF), the blood travels from the patient into a machine, gets filtered, and then travels back into the patient, typically by venovenous access (out of a vein and back into a vein).

In hemoperfusion, the blood perfuses a filter composed of artificial cells filled with activated carbon or another microporous material. Small molecules in solution within the serum (such as the toxin) cross the membranes into the microporous material (and get trapped therein), but formed elements (the blood cells) brush past the artificial cells just as they brush past each other. In this way, the microporous material's filtering ability can be used without destroying the blood cells.

First introduced in the 1940s, hemoperfusion was refined during the 1950s through 1970s, and then introduced clinically for the treatment of poisoning in the 1970s and 1980s. It is sometimes used to treat drug overdose, sometimes in conjunction with the other extracorporeal techniques previously mentioned.

The US Food and Drug Administration (FDA) defines sorbent hemoperfusion as follows:

″(a) Identification. A sorbent hemoperfusion system is a prescription device that consists of an extracorporeal blood system similar to that identified in the hemodialysis system and accessories (876.5820) and a container filled with adsorbent material that removes a wide range of substances, both toxic and normal, from blood flowing through it. The adsorbent materials are usually activated-carbon or resins which may be coated or immobilized to prevent fine particles entering the patient's blood. The generic type of device may include lines and filters specifically designed to connect the device to the extracorporeal blood system. The device is used in the treatment of poisoning, drug overdose, hepatic coma, or metabolic disturbances.″

Hemoperfusion is also used in the treatment of specific intoxications, such as valproic acid, theophylline, and meprobamate.

Despite its availability, this technique is only infrequently utilized as a medical process used to remove toxic substances from a patient's blood.

== Types ==
Two types of hemoperfusion are commonly used:

1. Charcoal hemoperfusion, which has been used to treat liver (hepatic) failure, various types of poisoning, and certain autoimmune diseases when coated with antigens or antibodies.
2. Certain resins (polystyrene - XAD series) are frequently more efficient at clearing lipid-soluble drugs than charcoal hemoperfusion.

== Complications ==
Complications of hemoperfusion may include thrombocytopenia, leucopenia, hypoglycemia, and some reduction in clotting factors, with recovery typically occurring in 1–2 days. Risk of bleeding is also higher because of the high heparin dose and reduction in platelets and clotting factors.

== Indications for use ==
During hemoperfusion, the blood passes through a column with absorptive properties aiming at removing specific toxic substances from the patient's blood. It especially targets small- to medium-sized molecules that tend to be more difficult to remove by conventional hemodialysis. The adsorbent substance most commonly used in hemoperfusion are resins and activated carbon. Hemoperfusion is an extracorporeal form of treatment because the blood is pumped through a device outside the patient's body.

Its major uses include removing drugs or poisons from the blood in emergency situations, removing waste products from the blood in patients with kidney failure, and as a supportive treatment for patients before and after liver transplantation.
