= Sayaka Matsumoto =

American judoka

Personal information
- Nationality: American
- Born: December 5, 1982 (age 43) Ōmiya, Saitama Prefecture, Japan
- Home town: El Cerrito, California
- Education: UC Berkeley
- Occupation(s): Judo Instructor, Marketing & Operations Assistant
- Height: 5 ft 2 in (1.57 m)

Sport
- Country: United States
- Sport: Judo
- Weight class: –48 kg
- Rank: 5th dan black belt
- Club: East Bay Judo Institute
- Coached by: David Matsumoto

Achievements and titles
- Olympic Games: 13th (2008)
- World Champ.: R16 (2005)
- Pan American Champ.: (2003)
Medal record
Women's judo
Representing United States
Pan American Championships
Silver medal – second place	2003 Salvador	–48 kg
Bronze medal – third place	2000 Orlando	–48 kg
Bronze medal – third place	2005 Caguas (PUR)	–48 kg
Bronze medal – third place	2006 Buenos Aires	–48 kg
World Juniors Championships
Silver medal – second place	2000 Nabeul	–48 kg
Pan American Junior Championships
Bronze medal – third place	2001 Acapulco	–48 kg

Profile at external databases
- IJF: 9231
- JudoInside.com: 11402
- Updated on February 23, 2022

Sayaka Matsumoto (サヤカ・松本; born December 5, 1982) is a Japanese-born American judoka. Matsumoto competed for the United States in the women's 48 kg judo event at the 2008 Summer Olympics.

Matsumoto, who was raised in California, is coached by her father, David Matsumoto. She began judo at the age of 5. Matsumoto won the 2004 U.S. Olympic Trials, but did not compete in the Olympics that year because the U.S. failed to earn a spot in her weight class. Matsumoto again won the U.S. Olympic Trials in 2008 and competed in the Olympic Games.

At the 2008 Summer Olympics she fought against Ryoko Tani (JPN) and Wu Shugen (CHN), but lost both matches.
