= Kate Adamala =

American synthetic biologist

- Education: University of Warsaw; Roma Tre University, Harvard University
- Scientific career
- Fields: Synthetic biology biology Bioengineering
- Institutions: University of Minnesota
- Doctoral advisor: Jack Szostak and Pier Luigi Luisi
- Other academic advisors: Ed Boyden
- Website: protobiology.org

Katarzyna Adamala is a Polish-born American synthetic biologist and a professor of genetics at the University of Minnesota.

== Research ==
Adamala's work includes contributions to the field of astrobiology, synthetic cell engineering and biocomputing.

Her research on prebiotic RNA replication provided an experimental scenario for the RNA world hypothesis of the origin of life. She has worked on constructing liposome bioreactor synthetic cells.

She is a founder and steering group member of the Build-a-Cell Initiative, an international collaboration for creation of synthetic live cells. She is a co-founder of synthetic cell company Synlife. Adamala and Szostak demonstrated non enzymatic RNA replication in primitive protocells is only possibly in presence of weak cation chelator like citric acid, providing further evidence for central role of citric acid in primordial metabolism.

In 2017 Adamala gave a TEDx talk entitled Life but not Alive about how and why humans can create synthetic cells.

== Mirror life and bioethics ==
In December 2024, Adamala co-authored a perspective article in Science calling for a moratorium on the creation of fully synthetic mirror-image microorganisms. "Mirror life" refers to organisms constructed entirely from mirror-image versions of natural biomolecules, such as L-sugars and D-amino acids, which are opposite in chirality to those found in terrestrial life. Adamala and co-authors cited concerns that such organisms could pose biosafety risks, including the possibility that they might evade immune detection or be resistant to existing antibiotics.

The statement was co-signed by 37 scientists, including Nobel Prize laureates Greg Winter and Jack W. Szostak. They argued that the field, while promising, requires a comprehensive risk assessment before advancing further.

Other researchers expressed skepticism, arguing that current technical limitations make the creation of such organisms unlikely in the near future. Chemist and Nobel laureate Benjamin List was among those who questioned the urgency of the concerns, stating that while bioethical caution is important, the field remains at a very early stage.

== SpudCells ==
In 2026, Adamala's lab announced that it had created near-living artificial organisms, nicknamed SpudCells.

== Selected Publications ==
- Engineering genetic circuit interactions within and between synthetic minimal cells (2016)
- Programmable RNA-binding protein composed of repeats of a single modular unit (2016)
- Collaboration between primitive cell membranes and soluble catalysts (2016)
- A simple physical mechanism enables homeostasis in primitive cells (2016)
- Generation of Functional RNAs from Inactive Oligonucleotide Complexes by Non-enzymatic Primer Extension (2013)
- Non-enzymatic template-directed RNA synthesis inside model protocells (2013)
