= Respirocyte =

Hypothetical artificial red blood cells

Respirocytes are hypothetical, microscopic, artificial red blood cells that are intended to emulate the function of their organic counterparts, so as to supplement or replace the function of much of the human body's normal respiratory system. Respirocytes were proposed by Robert A. Freitas Jr in his 1998 paper "A Mechanical Artificial Red Blood Cell: Exploratory Design in Medical Nanotechnology".

Respirocytes are an example of molecular nanotechnology, a field of technology still in the very earliest, purely hypothetical phase of development. Current technology is not sufficient to build a respirocyte due to considerations of power, atomic-scale manipulation, immune reaction or toxicity, computation and communication.

== Structure of a respirocyte ==
Freitas proposed a spherical robot made up of 18 billion atoms arranged as a tiny pressure tank, which would be filled up with oxygen and carbon dioxide.

== Uses ==
In Freitas' proposal, each respirocyte could store and transport 236 times more oxygen than a natural red blood cell, and could release it in a more controlled manner.

Freitas has also proposed "microbivore" robots that would attack pathogens in the manner of white blood cells.

== See also ==
- Artificial cell
- Biotechnology
- Blood substitute
- Oxycyte
- Synthetic biology
