= Artificial cell =

Engineered component of a biological cell

An artificial cell, synthetic cell or minimal cell is an engineered particle that mimics one or many functions of a biological cell. Often, artificial cells are biological or polymeric membranes which enclose biologically active materials. As such, liposomes, polymersomes, nanoparticles, microcapsules and a number of other particles can qualify as artificial cells.

The terms "artificial cell" and "synthetic cell" are used in a variety of different fields and can have different meanings. Some stricter definitions are based on the assumption that the term "cell" directly relates to biological cells and that these structures therefore have to be alive (or part of a living organism) and, further, that the term "artificial" implies that these structures are artificially built from the bottom-up, i.e. from basic components. As such, in the area of synthetic biology, an artificial cell can be understood as a completely synthetically made cell that can capture energy, maintain ion gradients, contain macromolecules as well as store information and have the ability to replicate. This kind of artificial cell has not yet been made.

Alternatively, the term "artificial" does not imply that the entire structure is man-made, but instead, it can refer to the idea that certain functions or structures of biological cells can be modified, simplified, replaced or supplemented with a synthetic entity.

In other fields, the term "artificial cell" can refer to any compartment that somewhat resembles a biological cell in size or structure, but is synthetically made, or even fully made from non-biological components. The term "artificial cell" is also used for structures with direct applications such as compartments for drug delivery. Micro-encapsulation allows for metabolism within the membrane, exchange of small molecules and prevention of passage of large substances across it. The main advantages of encapsulation include improved mimicry in the body, increased solubility of the cargo and decreased immune responses. Artificial cells have been clinically successful in hemoperfusion.

== Bottom-up engineering of living artificial cells ==
Diagram of lipid vesicles showing a solution of biomolecules (green dots) trapped in the vesicle interior.

German pathologist Rudolf Virchow proposed that not only does life arise from cells, but every cell comes from another cell; "Omnis cellula e cellula". Until now, most attempts to create an artificial cell have engineered modules that can mimic certain functions of living cells. Advances in cell-free transcription and translation reactions allow the expression of many genes as well as interdependent genetic and metabolic networks, but these efforts are still far from producing a fully operational cell.

A bottom-up approach to build an artificial cell would involve creating a protocell de novo, entirely from non-living materials. As the term "cell" implies, one prerequisite is the generation of some sort of compartment that defines an individual, cellular unit. Phospholipid membranes are an obvious choice as compartmentalizing boundaries, as they act as selective barriers in all living biological cells. Scientists can encapsulate biomolecules in cell-sized phospholipid vesicles and by doing so, observe these molecules to act similarly as in biological cells and thereby recreate certain cell functions. In a similar way, functional biological building blocks can be encapsulated in these lipid compartments to achieve the synthesis of (however rudimentary) artificial cells.

Researchers have proposed creating a phospholipid bilayer vesicle with DNA capable of self-reproducing using synthetic genetic information. The three primary elements of such artificial cells are the formation of a lipid membrane, DNA and RNA replication through a template process and the harvesting of chemical energy for active transport across the membrane. The main hurdles foreseen and encountered with this proposed protocell are the creation of a minimal synthetic DNA that holds all sufficient information for life, and the reproduction of non-genetic components that are integral in cell development such as molecular self-organization. However, it is hoped that this kind of bottom-up approach would provide insight into the fundamental questions of organizations at the cellular level and the origins of biological life. So far, no completely artificial cell capable of self-reproduction has been synthesized using the molecules of life, and this objective is still in the distant future although various groups are currently working towards this goal.

Another method proposed to create a protocell more closely resembles the conditions believed to have been present during evolution known as the primordial soup. Various RNA polymers could be encapsulated in vesicles and in such small boundary conditions, chemical reactions would be tested for.

=== Ethics and controversy ===
Protocell research has created controversy and opposing opinions, including critics of the vague definition of "artificial life". The creation of a basic unit of life is the most pressing ethical concern. Synthetic organisms could escape and cause damage to human health and ecosystems, or the technology could be used to make a biological weapon. Cells with certain non-standard biochemistries, such as mirror life, could also have a competitive advantage over natural organisms. Although according to Ting Zhu, "the creation of a mirror-image organism lies well beyond the reach of present-day science".

=== International research community ===
In the mid-2010s, the synthetic cell research community began recognising the need to unify the field, acknowledging that constructing an entire living organism from non-living components was beyond the resources of a single country.

National synthetic cell research program emerged across multiple regions during this period. In Germany, the MaxSynBio research network of the Max Planck Society and the Federal Minitrsy of Education and Research launched in August 2014, focusing on bottom-up synthetic biology approches. Beginning in 2017, several other European initiatives were established: BaSyC (Building a Synthetic Cell) in the Netherlands, funded by the NWO Gravitation programme, fabriCELL in the United Kingdom, and the European Synthetic Cell Initiative (SynCellEU), which sought to coordinate efforts across multiple countries including the Netherlands, Germnay, France, Spain, and the United Kingdom. In 2019 the NSF-funded international Build-a-Cell large-scale research collaboration for the construction of synthetic living cell was started. These programmes have conducted various interdisciplinary workshopping events, open to all interested, to discuss and guide the future of the synthetic cell community.

==== Global expansion ====
Following these early national programs, additional regional collaborations emerged, In 2023, the SynCell Asia Initiative was established by researchers at the Shenzhen Institute of Advanced Technology of the Chinese Academy of Sciences, bringing together more than 100 research teams from six countres: China, Japan, South Korea, Singapore, Malaysia, and Thailand.

== Top-down approach to create a minimal living cell ==
Members from the J. Craig Venter Institute have used a top-down computational approach to knock out genes in a living organism to a minimum set of genes. In 2010, the team succeeded in creating a replicating strain (named Mycoplasma laboratorium) of Mycoplasma mycoides using synthetically created DNA deemed to be the minimum requirement for life which was inserted into a genomically empty bacterium. Proponents suggest that the process of top-down biosynthesis will enable the insertion of new genes that would perform beneficial functions such as generation of hydrogen for fuel or capturing excess carbon dioxide in the atmosphere. The myriad regulatory, metabolic, and signaling networks are not completely characterized. These top-down approaches have limitations for the understanding of fundamental molecular regulation, since the host organisms have a complex and incompletely defined molecular composition. In 2019 a complete computational model of all pathways in Mycoplasma Syn3.0 cell was published, representing the first complete in silico model for a living minimal organism.

Heavy investing in biology has been done by large companies such as ExxonMobil, who has partnered with Synthetic Genomics Inc; Craig Venter's own biosynthetics company in the development of fuel from algae.

As of 2016, Mycoplasma genitalium is the only organism used as a starting point for engineering a minimal cell, since it has the smallest known genome that can be cultivated under laboratory conditions; the wild-type variety has 482, and removing exactly 100 genes deemed non-essential resulted in a viable strain with improved growth rates. Reduced-genome Escherichia coli is considered more useful, and viable strains have been developed with 15% of the genome removed.

A variation of an artificial cell has been created in which a completely synthetic genome was introduced to genomically emptied host cells. Although not completely artificial because the cytoplasmic components as well as the membrane from the host cell are kept, the engineered cell is under control of a synthetic genome and is able to replicate.

== Artificial cells for medical applications ==
Standard artificial cell (top) and drug delivery artificial cell (bottom).

=== History ===
In the 1960s Thomas Chang developed microcapsules which he would later call "artificial cells", as they were cell-sized compartments made from artificial materials. These cells consisted of ultrathin membranes of nylon, collodion or crosslinked protein whose semipermeable properties allowed diffusion of small molecules in and out of the cell. These cells were micron-sized and contained cells, enzymes, hemoglobin, magnetic materials, adsorbents and proteins.

Later artificial cells have ranged from hundred-micrometer to nanometer dimensions and can carry microorganisms, vaccines, genes, drugs, hormones and peptides. The first clinical use of artificial cells was in hemoperfusion by the encapsulation of activated charcoal.

In the 1970s, researchers were able to introduce enzymes, proteins and hormones to biodegradable microcapsules, later leading to clinical use in diseases such as Lesch–Nyhan syndrome. Although Chang's initial research focused on artificial red blood cells, only in the mid-1990s were biodegradable artificial red blood cells developed. Artificial cells in biological cell encapsulation were first used in the clinic in 1994 for treatment in a diabetic patient and since then other types of cells such as hepatocytes, adult stem cells and genetically engineered cells have been encapsulated and are under study for use in tissue regeneration.

=== Materials ===
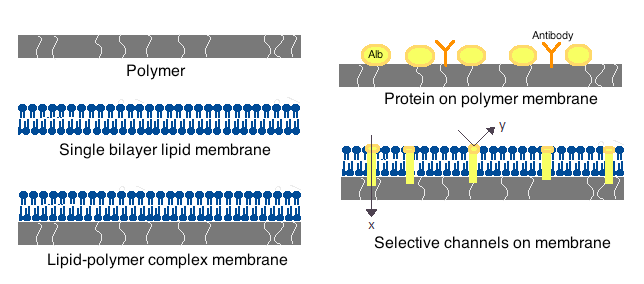
Representative types of artificial cell membranes.

Membranes for artificial cells can be made of simple polymers, crosslinked proteins, lipid membranes or polymer-lipid complexes. Further, membranes can be engineered to present surface proteins such as albumin, antigens, Na/K-ATPase carriers, or pores such as ion channels. Commonly used materials for the production of membranes include hydrogel polymers such as alginate, cellulose and thermoplastic polymers such as hydroxyethyl methacrylate-methyl methacrylate (HEMA- MMA), polyacrylonitrile-polyvinyl chloride (PAN-PVC), as well as variations of the above-mentioned. The material used determines the permeability of the cell membrane, which depends on the polymer choice and is important for determining adequate diffusion of nutrients, waste and other critical molecules. Hydrophilic polymers have the potential to be biocompatible and can be fabricated into a variety of forms which include polymer micelles, sol-gel mixtures, physical blends and crosslinked particles and nanoparticles. Of special interest are stimuli-responsive polymers that respond to pH or temperature changes for the use in targeted delivery. These polymers may be administered in the liquid form through a macroscopic injection and solidify or gel in situ because of the difference in pH or temperature. Nanoparticle and liposome preparations are also routinely used for material encapsulation and delivery. A major advantage of liposomes is their ability to fuse to cell and organelle membranes.

=== Preparation ===
Many variations for artificial cell preparation and encapsulation have been developed. Typically, vesicles such as a nanoparticle, polymersome or liposome are synthesized. An emulsion is typically made through the use of high pressure equipment such as a high pressure homogenizer or a Microfluidizer. Two micro-encapsulation methods for nitrocellulose are also described below.

==== High-pressure homogenization ====
In a high-pressure homogenizer, two liquids in oil/liquid suspension are forced through a small orifice under very high pressure. This process divides the products and allows the creation of extremely fine particles, as small as 1 nm.

==== Microfluidization ====
This technique uses a patented Microfluidizer to obtain a greater amount of homogenous suspensions that can create smaller particles than homogenizers. A homogenizer is first used to create a coarse suspension which is then pumped into the microfluidizer under high pressure. The flow is then split into two streams which will react at very high velocities in an interaction chamber until desired particle size is obtained. This technique allows for large scale production of phospholipid liposomes and subsequent material nanoencapsulations.

==== Drop method ====
In this method, a cell solution is incorporated dropwise into a collodion solution of cellulose nitrate. As the drop travels through the collodion, it is coated with a membrane due to the interfacial polymerization properties of the collodion. The cell later settles into paraffin, where the membrane sets, which is then suspended using a saline solution. The drop method is used for the creation of large artificial cells which encapsulate biological cells, stem cells and genetically engineered stem cells.

==== Emulsion method ====
The emulsion method differs in that the material to be encapsulated is usually smaller and is placed in the bottom of a reaction chamber where the collodion is added on top and centrifuged, or otherwise disturbed in order to create an emulsion. The encapsulated material is then dispersed and suspended in saline solution.

=== Clinical relevance ===
==== Drug release and delivery ====
Artificial cells used for drug delivery differ from other artificial cells since their contents are intended to diffuse out of the membrane, or be engulfed and digested by a host target cell. Often used are submicron, lipid membrane artificial cells that may be referred to as nanocapsules, nanoparticles, polymersomes, or other variations of the term.

A temperature-responsive system has been developed to use RNA thermometers to control the timing and location of cargo release from artificial cells. This is done by having artificial cells express a pore forming protein - alpha hemolysin - under the control of an RNA thermometer, allowing for cargo release to be coupled to temperature changes.

==== Enzyme therapy ====
Enzyme therapy is being actively studied for genetic metabolic diseases where an enzyme is over-expressed, under-expressed, defective, or completely absent. In the case of under-expression or expression of a defective enzyme, an active form of the enzyme is introduced in the body to compensate for the deficit. On the other hand, an enzymatic over-expression may be counteracted by introduction of a competing non-functional enzyme; that is, an enzyme which metabolizes the substrate into non-active products. When placed within an artificial cell, enzymes can carry out their function for a much longer period compared to free enzymes and can be further optimized by polymer conjugation.

The first enzyme studied under artificial cell encapsulation was asparaginase for the treatment of lymphosarcoma in mice. This treatment delayed the onset and growth of the tumor. These initial findings led to further research in the use of artificial cells for enzyme delivery in tyrosine dependent melanomas. These tumors have a higher dependency on tyrosine than normal cells for growth, and research has shown that lowering systemic levels of tyrosine in mice can inhibit growth of melanomas. The use of artificial cells in the delivery of tyrosinase; and enzyme that digests tyrosine, allows for better enzyme stability and is shown effective in the removal of tyrosine without the severe side-effects associated with tyrosine deprivation in the diet.

Artificial cell enzyme therapy is also of interest for the activation of prodrugs such as ifosfamide in certain cancers. Artificial cells encapsulating the cytochrome p450 enzyme which converts this prodrug into the active drug can be tailored to accumulate in the pancreatic carcinoma or implanting the artificial cells close to the tumor site. Here, the local concentration of the activated ifosfamide will be much higher than in the rest of the body thus preventing systemic toxicity. The treatment was successful in animals and showed a doubling in median survivals amongst patients with advanced-stage pancreatic cancer in phase I/II clinical trials, and a tripling in one-year survival rate.

==== Gene therapy ====
In treatment of genetic diseases, gene therapy aims to insert, alter or remove genes within an afflicted individual's cells. The technology relies heavily on viral vectors which raises concerns about insertional mutagenesis and systemic immune response that have led to human deaths and development of leukemia in clinical trials. Circumventing the need for vectors by using naked or plasmid DNA as its own delivery system also encounters problems such as low transduction efficiency and poor tissue targeting when given systemically.

Artificial cells have been proposed as a non-viral vector by which genetically modified non-autologous cells are encapsulated and implanted to deliver recombinant proteins in vivo. This type of immuno-isolation has been proven efficient in mice through delivery of artificial cells containing mouse growth hormone which rescued a growth-retardation in mutant mice. A few strategies have advanced to human clinical trials for the treatment of pancreatic cancer, lateral sclerosis and pain control.

==== Hemoperfusion ====
The first clinical use of artificial cells was in hemoperfusion by the encapsulation of activated charcoal. Activated charcoal has the capability of adsorbing many large molecules and has for a long time been known for its ability to remove toxic substances from the blood in accidental poisoning or overdose. However, perfusion through direct charcoal administration is toxic as it leads to embolisms and damage of blood cells followed by removal by platelets. Artificial cells allow toxins to diffuse into the cell while keeping the dangerous cargo within their ultrathin membrane.

Artificial cell hemoperfusion has been proposed as a less costly and more efficient detoxifying option than hemodialysis, in which blood filtering takes place only through size separation by a physical membrane. In hemoperfusion, thousands of adsorbent artificial cells are retained inside a small container through the use of two screens on either end through which patient blood perfuses. As the blood circulates, toxins or drugs diffuse into the cells and are retained by the absorbing material. The membranes of artificial cells are much thinner those used in dialysis and their small size means that they have a high membrane surface area. This means that a portion of cell can have a theoretical mass transfer that is a hundredfold higher than that of a whole artificial kidney machine. The device has been established as a routine clinical method for patients treated for accidental or suicidal poisoning but has also been introduced as therapy in liver failure and kidney failure by carrying out part of the function of these organs. Artificial cell hemoperfusion has also been proposed for use in immunoadsorption through which antibodies can be removed from the body by attaching an immunoadsorbing material such as albumin on the surface of the artificial cells. This principle has been used to remove blood group antibodies from plasma for bone marrow transplantation and for the treatment of hypercholesterolemia through monoclonal antibodies to remove low-density lipoproteins. Hemoperfusion is especially useful in countries with a weak hemodialysis manufacturing industry as the devices tend to be cheaper there and used in kidney failure patients.

==== Encapsulated cells ====
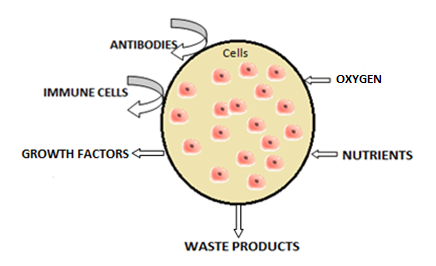
Schematic representation of encapsulated cells within artificial membrane.

The most common method of preparation of artificial cells is through cell encapsulation. Encapsulated cells are typically achieved through the generation of controlled-size droplets from a liquid cell suspension which are then rapidly solidified or gelled to provide added stability. The stabilization may be achieved through a change in temperature or via material crosslinking. The microenvironment that a cell sees changes upon encapsulation. It typically goes from being on a monolayer to a suspension in a polymer scaffold within a polymeric membrane. A drawback of the technique is that encapsulating a cell decreases its viability and ability to proliferate and differentiate. Further, after some time within the microcapsule, cells form clusters that inhibit the exchange of oxygen and metabolic waste, leading to apoptosis and necrosis thus limiting the efficacy of the cells and activating the host's immune system. Artificial cells have been successful for transplanting a number of cells including islets of Langerhans for diabetes treatment, parathyroid cells and adrenal cortex cells.

==== Encapsulated hepatocytes ====
Shortage of organ donors make artificial cells key players in alternative therapies for liver failure. The use of artificial cells for hepatocyte transplantation has demonstrated feasibility and efficacy in providing liver function in models of animal liver disease and bioartificial liver devices. Research stemmed off experiments in which the hepatocytes were attached to the surface of a micro-carriers and has evolved into hepatocytes which are encapsulated in a three-dimensional matrix in alginate microdroplets covered by an outer skin of polylysine. A key advantage to this delivery method is the circumvention of immunosuppression therapy for the duration of the treatment. Hepatocyte encapsulations have been proposed for use in a bioartificial liver. The device consists of a cylindrical chamber imbedded with isolated hepatocytes through which patient plasma is circulated extra-corporeally in a type of hemoperfusion. Because microcapsules have a high surface area to volume ratio, they provide large surface for substrate diffusion and can accommodate a large number of hepatocytes. Treatment to induced liver failure mice showed a significant increase in the rate of survival. Artificial liver systems are still in early development but show potential for patients waiting for organ transplant or while a patient's own liver regenerates sufficiently to resume normal function. So far, clinical trials using artificial liver systems and hepatocyte transplantation in end-stage liver diseases have shown improvement of health markers but have not yet improved survival. The short longevity and aggregation of artificial hepatocytes after transplantation are the main obstacles encountered. Hepatocytes co-encapsulated with stem cells show greater viability in culture and after implantation and implantation of artificial stem cells alone have also shown liver regeneration. As such interest has arisen in the use of stem cells for encapsulation in regenerative medicine.

==== Encapsulated bacterial cells ====
The oral ingestion of live bacterial cell colonies has been proposed and is currently in therapy for the modulation of intestinal microflora, prevention of diarrheal diseases, treatment of H. Pylori infections, atopic inflammations, lactose intolerance and immune modulation, amongst others. The proposed mechanism of action is not fully understood but is believed to have two main effects. The first is the nutritional effect, in which the bacteria compete with toxin producing bacteria. The second is the sanitary effect, which stimulates resistance to colonization and stimulates immune response. The oral delivery of bacterial cultures is often a problem because they are targeted by the immune system and often destroyed when taken orally. Artificial cells help address these issues by providing mimicry into the body and selective or long term release thus increasing the viability of bacteria reaching the gastrointestinal system. In addition, live bacterial cell encapsulation can be engineered to allow diffusion of small molecules including peptides into the body for therapeutic purposes. Membranes that have proven successful for bacterial delivery include cellulose acetate and variants of alginate. Additional uses that have arisen from encapsulation of bacterial cells include protection against challenge from M. Tuberculosis and upregulation of Ig secreting cells from the immune system. The technology is limited by the risk of systemic infections, adverse metabolic activities and the risk of gene transfer. However, the greater challenge remains the delivery of sufficient viable bacteria to the site of interest.

==== Artificial blood cells as oxygen carriers ====
Nano sized oxygen carriers are used as a type of red blood cell substitutes, although they lack other components of red blood cells. They are composed of a synthetic polymersome or an artificial membrane surrounding purified animal, human or recombinant hemoglobin. Overall, hemoglobin delivery continues to be a challenge because it is highly toxic when delivered without any modifications. In some clinical trials, vasopressor effects have been observed.

==== Artificial red blood cells ====
Research interest in the use of artificial cells for blood arose after the AIDS scare of the 1980s. Besides bypassing the potential for disease transmission, artificial red blood cells are desired because they eliminate drawbacks associated with allogenic blood transfusions such as blood typing, immune reactions and its short storage life of 42 days. A hemoglobin substitute may be stored at room temperature and not under refrigeration for more than a year. Attempts have been made to develop a complete working red blood cell which comprises carbonic not only an oxygen carrier but also the enzymes associated with the cell. The first attempt was made in 1957 by replacing the red blood cell membrane by an ultrathin polymeric membrane which was followed by encapsulation through a lipid membrane and more recently a biodegradable polymeric membrane. A biological red blood cell membrane including lipids and associated proteins can also be used to encapsulate nanoparticles and increase residence time in vivo by bypassing macrophage uptake and systemic clearance.

==== Artificial leuko-polymersomes ====
A leuko-polymersome is a polymersome engineered to have the adhesive properties of a leukocyte. Polymersomes are vesicles composed of a bilayer sheet that can encapsulate many active molecules such as drugs or enzymes. By adding the adhesive properties of a leukocyte to their membranes, they can be made to slow down, or roll along epithelial walls within the quickly flowing circulatory system.

== Unconventional types of artificial cells ==
=== Electronic artificial cell ===
The concept of an Electronic Artificial Cell has been expanded in a series of 3 EU projects coordinated by John McCaskill from 2004 to 2015.

The European Commission sponsored the development of the Programmable Artificial Cell Evolution (PACE) program from 2004 to 2008 whose goal was to lay the foundation for the creation of "microscopic self-organizing, self-replicating, and evolvable autonomous entities built from simple organic and inorganic substances that can be genetically programmed to perform specific functions" for the eventual integration into information systems. The PACE project developed the first Omega Machine, a microfluidic life support system for artificial cells that could complement chemically missing functionalities (as originally proposed by Norman Packard, Steen Rasmussen, Mark Beadau and John McCaskill). The ultimate aim was to attain an evolvable hybrid cell in a complex microscale programmable environment. The functions of the Omega Machine could then be removed stepwise, posing a series of solvable evolution challenges to the artificial cell chemistry. The project achieved chemical integration up to the level of pairs of the three core functions of artificial cells (a genetic subsystem, a containment system and a metabolic system), and generated novel spatially resolved programmable microfluidic environments for the integration of containment and genetic amplification. The project led to the creation of the European center for living technology.

Following this research, in 2007, John McCaskill proposed to concentrate on an electronically complemented artificial cell, called the Electronic Chemical Cell. The key idea was to use a massively parallel array of electrodes coupled to locally dedicated electronic circuitry, in a two-dimensional thin film, to complement emerging chemical cellular functionality. Local electronic information defining the electrode switching and sensing circuits could serve as an electronic genome, complementing the molecular sequential information in the emerging protocols. A research proposal was successful with the European Commission and an international team of scientists partially overlapping with the PACE consortium commenced work 2008–2012 on the project Electronic Chemical Cells. The project demonstrated among other things that electronically controlled local transport of specific sequences could be used as an artificial spatial control system for the genetic proliferation of future artificial cells, and that core processes of metabolism could be delivered by suitably coated electrode arrays.

The major limitation of this approach, apart from the initial difficulties in mastering microscale electrochemistry and electrokinetics, is that the electronic system is interconnected as a rigid non-autonomous piece of macroscopic hardware. In 2011, McCaskill proposed to invert the geometry of electronics and chemistry : instead of placing chemicals in an active electronic medium, to place microscopic autonomous electronics in a chemical medium. He organized a project to tackle a third generation of Electronic Artificial Cells at the 100 μm scale that could self-assemble from two half-cells "lablets" to enclose an internal chemical space, and function with the aid of active electronics powered by the medium they are immersed in. Such cells can copy both their electronic and chemical contents and will be capable of evolution within the constraints provided by their special pre-synthesized microscopic building blocks. In September 2012 work commenced on this project.

=== Artificial neurons ===
There is research and development into physical artificial neurons – organic and inorganic.

For example, some artificial neurons can receive and release dopamine (chemical signals rather than electrical signals) and communicate with natural rat muscle and brain cells, with potential for use in BCIs/prosthetics.

Low-power biocompatible memristors may enable construction of artificial neurons which function at voltages of biological action potentials and could be used to directly process biosensing signals, for neuromorphic computing and/or direct communication with biological neurons.

Organic neuromorphic circuits made out of polymers, coated with an ion-rich gel to enable a material to carry an electric charge like real neurons, have been built into a robot, enabling it to learn sensorimotorically within the real world, rather than via simulations or virtually. Moreover, artificial spiking neurons made of soft matter (polymers) can operate in biologically relevant environments and enable the synergetic communication between the artificial and biological domains.

=== Jeewanu ===
Jeewanu protocells are synthetic chemical particles that possess cell-like structure and seem to have some functional living properties. First synthesized in 1963 from simple minerals and basic organics while exposed to sunlight, it is still reported to have some metabolic capabilities, the presence of semipermeable membrane, amino acids, phospholipids, carbohydrates and RNA-like molecules. However, the nature and properties of the Jeewanu remains to be clarified.

=== Semi-artificial cyborg cells ===
A combination of synthetic biology, nanotechnology and materials science approaches have been used to create a few different iterations of bacterial cyborg cells. These different types of mechanically enhanced bacteria are created with so called bionic manufacturing principles that combine natural cells with abiotic materials. In 2005, researchers from the Department of Chemical Engineering at the University of Nebraska, Lincoln created a super sensitive humidity sensor by coating the bacteria Bacillus cereus with gold nanoparticles, being the first to use a microorganism to make an electronic device and presumably the first cyborg bacteria or cellborg circuit. Researchers from the Department of Chemistry at the University of California, Berkeley published a series of articles in 2016 describing the development of cyborg bacteria capable to harvest sunlight more efficiently than plants. In the first study, the researchers induced the self-photosensitization of a nonphotosynthetic bacterium, Moorella thermoacetica, with cadmium sulfide nanoparticles, enabling the photosynthesis of acetic acid from carbon dioxide. A follow-up article described the elucidation of the mechanism of semiconductor-to-bacterium electron transfer that allows the transformation of carbon dioxide and sunlight into acetic acid. Scientists of the Department of Biomedical Engineering at the University of California, Davis and Academia Sinica in Taiwan, developed a different approach to create cyborg cells by assembling a synthetic hydrogel inside the bacterial cytoplasm of Escherichia. coli cells rendering them incapable of dividing and making them resistant to environmental factors, antibiotics and high oxidative stress. The intracellular infusion of synthetic hydrogel provides these cyborg cells with an artificial cytoskeleton and their acquired tolerance makes them well placed to become a new class of drug-delivery systems positioned between classical synthetic materials and cell-based systems.

== See also ==
- Artificial gene synthesis
- Protocell
- Synthetic biology
  - Artificial life
  - SpudCell, a type of artificial cell
- Targeted drug delivery
- Respirocyte
- Chemoton
- Jeewanu
- Replicant
