= Flora (microbiology) =

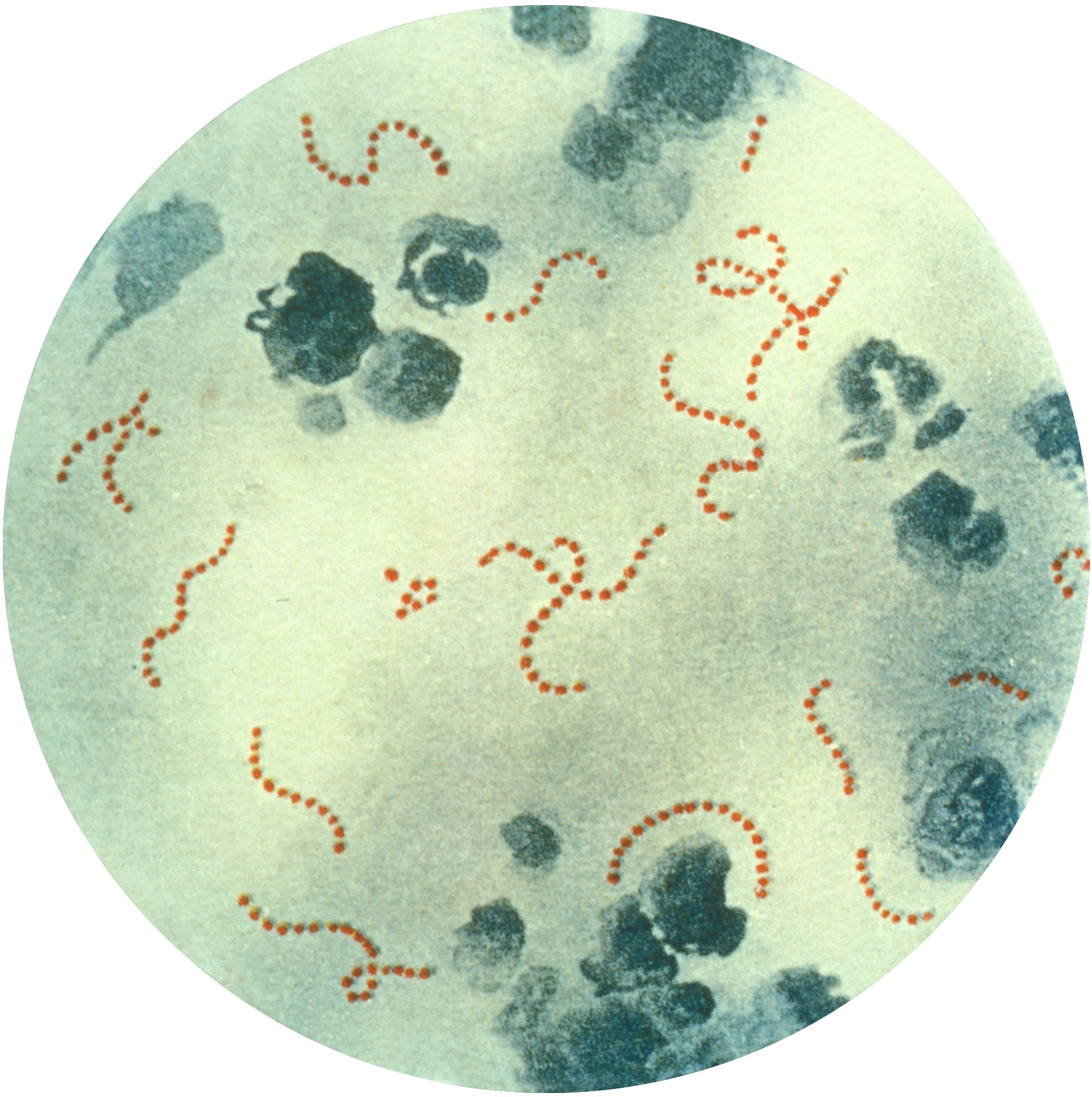
Photomicrograph of the microflora Streptococcus pyogenes bacteria, 900x mag.

In microbiology, collective bacteria and other microorganisms in a host are historically known as flora. Although microflora is commonly used, the term microbiota is becoming more common as microflora is a misnomer. Flora pertains to the Kingdom Plantae. Microbiota includes Archaea, Bacteria, Fungi and Protists. Microbiota with animal-like characteristics can be classified as microfauna.

== History ==
The terms "Flora" and "Fauna" were first used by Carl Linnaeus from Sweden in the title of his 1745 work Flora Suecica and Fauna Suecica. At that time, biology was focused on macroorganisms. Later, with the advent of microscopy, the new discovered ubiquitous microorganisms were fit in this system. Then, Fauna included moving organisms (animals and protist as "micro-fauna") and Flora the organisms with apparent no movement (plants/fungi; and bacteria as "microflora"). The terms "microfauna" and "microflora" are common in old books, but recently they have been replaced by the more adequate term "microbiota". Microbiota includes Archaea, Bacteria, Fungi and Protists.

== Microflora classification ==
Microflora are grouped into two categories based on the origin of the microorganism.

- Autochthonous flora. - Bacteria and microorganisms native to the host environment
- Allochthonous flora. - Temporary microorganisms non-native to the host environment

== Roles ==
Microflora is a term that refers to a community of bacteria that exist on or inside the body, and possess a unique ecological relationship with the host. This relationship encompasses a wide variety of microorganisms and the interactions between microbes. These interactions are often a mutualistic relationships between the host and autochthonous flora. Microflora responsible for harmful diseases are often allochthonous flora.

The modern term is "Microbiome" and include microorganisms that have different roles in ecosystems or hosts, including free-living organisms, or organisms associated to hosts, such animals (including humans) or plants.

== Projects ==
In 2008, the National Institutes of Health started the Human Microbiome Project designed to help understand the health implications of human bacterial flora. Biologists believe that bacterial flora may play some role in disorders such as multiple sclerosis. Additionally, the study of flora can have industrial benefits such as dietary supplements like probiotics. The living microorganisms in probiotics are believed to have positive effects on health, and have been utilized in studies regarding gastrointestinal diseases and allergies.

In 2014, the Earth Microbiome project proposed a broad initiative to identify the diversity and importance of the microbiota in different ecosystems across the planet, including free-living microbiota (in water and terrestrial systems) and host associated-microbiota (associated with plants and animals).

== See also ==
- Gut microbiota
- Microbiome
- Human microbiome
- List of human microbiota
