= Thomas Chang =

Canadian inventor, physician, and physiologist (born 1933)

Sir Thomas Ming Swi Chang
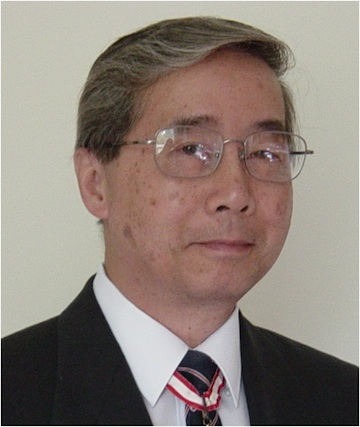
- Born: 8 April 1933 (age 93); Shantou, China
- Occupations: Physician, inventor, physiologist
- Awards: Order of Canada

Thomas Ming Swi Chang, OC (born 8 April 1933) is a Chinese-born Canadian inventor, physician, and physiologist.

While an undergraduate at McGill University in 1957, Chang invented the world's first artificial cell. He worked from his dormitory in McGill's Douglas Hall, using improvised materials like perfume atomizers. Ultimately, Chang managed to create a permeable plastic sack that would effectively carry haemoglobin almost as effectively as a natural blood cell. He went on to complete his B.Sc. (1957), M.D., C.M. (1961), and Ph.D (1965) degrees at McGill. Chang's career continued as founder and Director of the Artificial Cells and Organs Research Centre and Professor of Physiology, Medicine & Biomedical Engineering in the Faculty of Medicine at McGill University.

In the late 1960s he discovered enzymes carried by artificial cells could correct some metabolic disorders and also developed charcoal-filled cells to treat drug poisoning. His work on finding a safe blood substitute brought him to prominence in the 1980s and 1990s, earning him an Order of Canada. The Canadian Academy of Health Sciences states, "Dr. Chang’s original ideas were years ahead of the modern era of nanotechnology, regenerative medicine, gene therapy, stem cell/cell therapy and blood substitutes. He was nominated twice for the Nobel Prize".

In 2011, Dr. Chang was voted the winner of the Greatest McGillian contest organized by the McGill Alumni Association for McGill's 190th anniversary. In 2023, he received an honorary D.Sc. from the University of British Columbia.
