= Immunoisolate =

In general, immunoisolation is the process of protecting implanted material such as biopolymers, cells, or drug release carriers from an immune reaction. The most prominent means of accomplishing this is through the use of cell encapsulation.
