= Protocell =

Lipid globule proposed as a precursor of living cells

A protocell (or protobiont) is a self-organized, membrane-bound or membraneless compartment that concentrates biomolecules, proposed as a rudimentary precursor to cells during the origin of life. It is a minimal unit that can undergo Darwinian evolution. The term "protocell" is also used interchangeably with other terms such as "artificial cell", "minimal cell", "synthetic cell" to describe similar things developed in a laboratory. A central question in evolution is how simple protocells first arose and how their progeny could diversify, thus enabling the accumulation of novel biological emergences over time (i.e. biological evolution). Although a functional protocell that evolves has not yet been achieved in a laboratory setting, the goal to understand the process appears possible.

A protocell is a pre-cell in abiogenesis, and was a contained system consisting of simple biologically relevant molecules like ribozymes, and encapsulated in a simple membrane structure – isolating the entity from the environment and other individuals – thought to consist of simple fatty acids, mineral structures, or rock-pore structures.

== Overview ==
Compartmentalization was important in the origin of life. Membranes form enclosed compartments that are separate from the external environment, thus providing the cell with functionally specialized aqueous spaces. As the lipid bilayer of membranes is impermeable to most hydrophilic molecules (dissolved by water), modern cells have membrane transport-systems that achieve nutrient uptake as well as the export of waste. Prior to the development of these molecular assemblies, protocells likely employed vesicle dynamics that are relevant to cellular functions, such as membrane trafficking and self-reproduction, using amphiphilic molecules. On the primitive Earth, numerous chemical reactions of organic compounds produced the ingredients of life. Of these substances, amphiphilic molecules might be the first player in the evolution from molecular assembly to cellular life. Vesicle dynamics could progress towards protocells with the development of self-replication coupled with early metabolism. It is possible that protocells might have had a primitive metabolic system (Wood-Ljungdahl pathway) at alkaline hydrothermal vents or other geological environments like impact crater lakes from meteorites, which are known to be composed of elements found in the Wood-Ljungdahl pathway.

Another conceptual model of a protocell relates to the term "chemoton" (short for 'chemical automaton') which refers to the fundamental unit of life introduced by Hungarian theoretical biologist Tibor Gánti. It is the oldest known computational abstract of a protocell. Gánti conceived the basic idea in 1952 and formulated the concept in 1971 in his book The Principles of Life (originally written in Hungarian, and translated to English only in 2003). He surmised the chemoton as the original ancestor of all organisms, or the last universal common ancestor.

The basic assumption of the chemoton model is that life should fundamentally and essentially have three properties: metabolism, self-replication, and a bilipid membrane. The metabolic and replication functions together form an autocatalytic subsystem necessary for the basic functions of life, and a membrane encloses this subsystem to separate it from the surrounding environment. Therefore, any system having such properties may be regarded as alive, and will contain self-sustaining cellular information that is subject to natural selection. Some consider this model a significant contribution to origin of life as it provides a philosophy of evolutionary units.

== Selectivity for compartmentalization ==
The three main structures phospholipids form in solution: the liposome (a closed bilayer), the micelle and the bilayer.

Self-assembled vesicles are essential components of primitive cells. The second law of thermodynamics requires that the universe becomes increasingly disordered (entropy), yet life is distinguished by its great degree of organization. Therefore, a boundary is needed to separate life processes from non-living matter. This fundamental necessity is underpinned by the universality of the cell membrane which is the only cellular structure found in all organisms on Earth.

In the aqueous environment in which all known cells function, a non-aqueous barrier is required to surround a cell and separate it from its surroundings. This non-aqueous membrane establishes a barrier to free diffusion, allowing for regulation of the internal environment within the barrier. The necessity of thermodynamically isolating a subsystem is an irreducible condition of life. In modern biology, such isolation is ordinarily accomplished by amphiphilic bilayers of a thickness of around 10^{−8} meters.

Researchers including Irene A. Chen and Jack W. Szostak have demonstrated that simple physicochemical properties of elementary protocells can give rise to simpler conceptual analogues of essential cellular behaviors, including primitive forms of Darwinian competition and energy storage. Such cooperative interactions between the membrane and encapsulated contents could greatly simplify the transition from replicating molecules to true cells. Competition for membrane molecules would favor stabilized membranes, suggesting a selective advantage for the evolution of cross-linked fatty acids and even the phospholipids of today. This micro-encapsulation allowed for metabolism within the membrane, exchange of small molecules and prevention of passage of large substances across it. The main advantages of encapsulation include increased solubility of the cargo and creating energy in the form of chemical gradients. Energy is thus often said to be stored by cells in molecular structures such as carbohydrates (including sugars), lipids, and proteins, which release energy when chemically combined with oxygen during cellular respiration.

== Vesicles, micelles and membranes ==
Scheme of a micelle spontaneously formed by phospholipids in an aqueous solution

When phospholipids or simple lipids like fatty acids are placed in water, the molecules spontaneously arrange such that the hydrophobic tails are shielded from the water, resulting in the formation of membrane structures such as bilayers, vesicles, and micelles. In modern cells, vesicles are involved in metabolism, transport, buoyancy control, and enzyme storage. They can also act as natural chemical reaction chambers. A typical vesicle or micelle in aqueous solution forms an aggregate with the hydrophilic "head" regions in contact with surrounding solvent, sequestering the hydrophobic single-tail regions in the micelle center. This phase is caused by the packing behavior of single-tail lipids in a bilayer. Although the spontaneous self-assembly process that form lipid monolayer vesicles and micelles in nature resemble the kinds of primordial vesicles or protocells that might have existed at the beginning of evolution, they are not as sophisticated as the bilayer membranes of today's living organisms. However, in a prebiotic context, electrostatic interactions induced by short, positively charged, hydrophobic peptides containing seven amino acids in length or fewer, can attach RNA to a vesicle membrane, the basic cell membrane.

Rather than being made up of phospholipids, early membranes may have formed from monolayers or bilayers of simple fatty acids, which may have formed more readily in a prebiotic environment. Fatty acids have been synthesized in laboratories under a variety of prebiotic conditions and have been found on meteorites, suggesting their natural synthesis in nature. Oleic acid vesicles represent good models of membrane protocells.

Põldsalu et al. (2021) suggested that the formation of model protocells from multilamellar lipid reservoirs starting from mixed amphiphiles is a plausible scenario for the emergence of the first cells.

Cohen et al. (2022) suggested that plausible prebiotic production of fatty acids — leading to the development of early protocell membranes — is enriched on metal-rich mineral surfaces, possibly from impact craters, increasing the prebiotic environmental mass of lipids by 10^{2} times. They evaluated three different possible synthesis pathways of fatty acids in the Hadean, and found that these metal surfaces could produce 10^{11} - 10^{15} kg of 6-18 carbon fatty acids. Of these products, the 8-18C fatty acids are compatible with membrane formation. They also proposed that alternative amphiphiles like alcohols are co-synthesized with fatty acid, and can help improve membrane stability. However, despite this production, the authors stated that net fatty acid synthesis would not yield sufficient concentrations for spontaneous membrane formation without significant evaporation of Earth's aqueous environments.

Cho et al. (2024) showed that cysteine can generate membrane vesicles characteristic of protocells by spontaneously reacting with two short-chain thioesters to form diacyl lipids. That same year, Pulletikurti et al. showed a potential mechanism for the transition from fatty-acid-based to phospholipid vesicles using cyclic-phospholipids formed from fatty acids and glycerol. Also that year, while replicating the Miller-Urey experiment, Jenewein et al. found that silica in the presence of water induces the formation of biomorphic protocells.

== Membrane transport ==
Schematic showing two possible conformations of the lipids at the edge of a pore. In the top image the lipids have not rearranged, so the pore wall is hydrophobic. In the bottom image some of the lipid heads have bent over, so the pore wall is hydrophilic.

For cellular organisms, the transport of specific molecules across compartmentalizing membrane barriers is essential in order to exchange content with their environment and with other individuals. For example, content exchange between individuals enables the exchange of genes (horizontal gene transfer), an important factor in the evolution of cellular life. While modern cells can rely on complicated protein machineries to catalyze these crucial processes, protocells must have accomplished this using more simple mechanisms.

Protocells composed of fatty acids would have been able to easily exchange small molecules and ions with their environment. Modern phospholipid bilayer cell membranes exhibit low permeability, but contain complex molecular assemblies which both actively and passively transport relevant molecules across the membrane in a highly specific manner. In the absence of these complex assemblies, simple fatty acid based protocell membranes would be more permeable and allow for greater non-specific transport across membranes. Molecules that would be highly permeable across protocell membranes include nucleoside monophosphate (NMP), nucleoside diphosphate (NDP), and nucleoside triphosphate (NTP), and may withstand millimolar concentrations of Mg^{2+}. Osmotic pressure can also play a significant role regarding this passive membrane transport.

Environmental effects have been suggested to trigger conditions under which a transport of larger molecules, such as DNA and RNA, across the membranes of protocells is possible. For example, it has been proposed that electroporation resulting from lightning strikes could enable such transport. Electroporation is the rapid increase in bilayer permeability induced by the application of a large artificial electric field across the membrane. During electroporation, the lipid molecules in the membrane shift position, opening up a pore (hole) that acts as a conductive pathway through which hydrophobic molecules like nucleic acids can pass the lipid bilayer. A similar transfer of content across protocells and with the surrounding solution can be caused by freezing and subsequent thawing. This could, for instance, occur in an environment in which day and night cycles cause recurrent freezing. Laboratory experiments have shown that such conditions allow an exchange of genetic information between populations of protocells. This can be explained by the fact that membranes are highly permeable at temperatures slightly below their phase transition temperature. If this point is reached during the freeze-thaw cycle, even large and highly charged molecules can temporarily pass the protocell membrane.

Some molecules or particles are too large or too hydrophilic to pass through a lipid bilayer even under these conditions, but can be moved across the membrane through fusion or budding of vesicles, events which have also been observed for freeze-thaw cycles. This may eventually have led to mechanisms that facilitate movement of molecules to the inside of the protocell (endocytosis) or to release its contents into the extracellular space (exocytosis).

== Biomolecular condensates as protocells ==
In origin‑of‑life research, biomolecular condensates—dynamic, membraneless compartments formed by liquid–liquid phase separation of polymers such as proteins and nucleic acids—have been proposed as plausible protocell models that could concentrate and organize prebiotic chemistry without a lipid membrane. Such coacervate‑like droplets create localized microenvironments that facilitate molecular crowding and selective enrichment of reactants, potentially lowering barriers to primitive catalysis and reaction networks important for early evolution. The concept of condensate‑based protocells extends early coacervation theories and finds support in modern work showing how phase‑separated droplets can act as compartmentalized reaction centers for nucleic acids or peptides. Recent experimental studies further reveal that external stimuli, including UV illumination, can modify the material properties and stability of condensates: for example, UV‑induced thymine dimerization within DNA‑based condensates alters their mechanochemistry and fusion dynamics, leading to transitions between liquid‑like behaviour and more arrested, solid‑like architectures and promoting the formation of stable, compartmentalized droplets that resist coalescence and environmental fluctuations. Such optically programmable crosslinks within condensates suggest mechanisms by which phase‑separated protocell analogues could persist or evolve under prebiotic conditions, offering a potential pathway for stabilizing early biochemical reaction compartments.

== Suitable prebiotic environments ==
See also: Abiogenesis: Suitable Geologic Environment, RNA World: Prebiotic RNA Synthesis

=== Hydrothermal systems ===
This fluid lipid bilayer cross section is made up entirely of phosphatidylcholine.

It has been proposed that life began in hydrothermal vents in the deep sea, but a 2012 study suggests that hot springs have the ideal characteristics for the origin of life. The conclusion is based mainly on the chemistry of modern cells, where the cytoplasm is rich in potassium, zinc, manganese, and phosphate ions, not widespread in marine environments. Such conditions, the researchers argue, are found only where hot hydrothermal fluid brings the ions to the surface—places such as geysers, mud pots, fumaroles and other geothermal features. Within these fuming and bubbling basins, water laden with zinc and manganese ions could have collected, cooled and condensed in shallow pools. However, a recent discovery of alkaline hydrothermal vents with an ionic concentration of sodium lower than in seawater suggests that high concentrations of potassium can be found at marine environments.

A study in the 1990s showed that montmorillonite clay can help create RNA chains of as many as 50 nucleotides joined together spontaneously into a single RNA molecule. Later, in 2002, it was discovered that by adding montmorillonite to a solution of fatty acid micelles (lipid spheres), the clay sped up the rate of vesicle formation 100-fold.

Some minerals can catalyze the stepwise formation of hydrocarbon tails of fatty acids from hydrogen and carbon monoxide gases—gases that may have been released from hydrothermal vents or geysers. Fatty acids of various lengths are eventually released into the surrounding water, but vesicle formation requires a higher concentration of fatty acids, so it is suggested that protocell formation started at land-bound hydrothermal freshwater environments such as geysers, mud pots, fumaroles and other geothermal features where water evaporates and concentrates the solute.

In 2019, Nick Lane and colleagues show that vesicles form readily in seawater conditions at pH between 6.5 and >12 and temperatures 70 °C, meant to mimic the conditions of alkaline hydrothermal vents, with the presence of lipid mixtures, however a prebiotic source to such mixtures is unclear in those environments. Simple amphiphilic compounds in seawater do not assemble into vesicles because of the high concentration of ionic solutes. Research has shown that vesicles can be bound and stabilized by prebiotic amino acids even while in the presence of salt ions and magnesium ions.

In hot spring conditions, self-assembly of vesicles occurs, which have a lower concentration of ionic solutes. Scientists oligomerized RNA in alkaline hydrothermal vent conditions in the laboratory. Although they were estimated to be 4 units in length, it implies RNA polymers possibly were synthesized at such environments. Experimental research at hot springs gave higher yields of RNA-like polymers than in the laboratory. The polymers were encapsulated in fatty acid vesicles when rehydrated, further supporting the hot spring hypothesis of abiogenesis. These wet-dry cycles also improved vesicle stability and binding. UV exposure has also been shown to promote the synthesis of stable biomolecules like nucleotides.

In the origin of chemiosmosis, if early cells originated at alkaline hydrothermal vents, proton gradients can be maintained by the acidic ocean and alkaline water from white smokers while an inorganic membranous structure is in a rock cavity. If early cells originated in terrestrial pools such as hot springs, quinones present in meteorites like the Murchison meteorite would promote the development of proton gradients by coupled redox reactions if the ferricyanide, the electron acceptor, was within the vesicle and an electron donor like a sulfur compound was outside of the lipid membrane. Because of the "water problem", a primitive ATP synthase and other biomolecules would go through hydrolysis due to the absence of wet-dry cycles at hydrothermal vents, unlike at terrestrial pools. Other researchers propose hydrothermal pore systems coated in mineral gels at deep sea hydrothermal vents to an alternative compartment of membranous structures, promote biochemical reactions of biopolymers, and could solve the "water problem". David Deamer and Bruce Damer argue that biomolecules would become trapped within these pore systems upon polymerization and would not undergo combinatorial selection. Catalytic FeS and NiS walls at alkaline hydrothermal vents has also been suggested to have promoted polymerization.

However, Jackson (2016) evaluates how the pH gradient between alkaline hydrothermal vents and acidic Hadean seawater might influence prebiotic synthesis. Three main criticisms emerge from this evaluation. Firstly, the maintenance and stability of membranes positioned suitably between turbulent pH gradients seemed implausible. They claim that the proposition of CaCO_{3} and Mg(OH)_{2} precipitates interacting with fluid mixing in subsurface pores do not produce satisfactory environments. Secondly, they suggest that the molecular assemblies required to utilize key energetic gradients available at hydrothermal systems were too complex to have been relevant at the origin of life. Lastly, they argue that even if a molecular assembly could have harvested available hydrothermal energy, those assemblies would have been too large to operate within the proposed membrane thicknesses accepted by proponents of the hydrothermal vent hypothesis. In 2017, Jackson takes a further stance, suggesting that even if an organism successfully originated in alkaline hydrothermal pores, exploiting natural pH gradients for energy, it would not be able to withstand the drastic change of environment after emergence from the vent environment in which it had solely evolved. This emergence, however, is essential to the niche differentiation of life, allowing for the diversification of habitats and energetic strategies. Counters to these arguments suggest that the close resemblance between biochemical pathways and geochemical systems at alkaline hydrothermal vents gives merit to the hypothesis, and that selection on these protocells would improve resilience to environmental change, allowing for emergence and distribution.

It has been considered by other researchers that life originating in hydrothermal volcanic ponds exposed to UV radiation, zinc sulfide photocatalysis, and occurrence of continuous wet-dry cycling would not resemble modern biochemistry. Maximal ATP synthesis is shown to occur at high water activity and low ion concentrations. Despite this, hydrothermal vents are still considered to be a feasible environment as some shallow hydrothermal vents emit freshwater and the concentration of divalent cations in Hadean oceans were likely lower than in modern oceans. Nick Lane and coauthors state that "alkaline hydrothermal systems tend to precipitate Ca^{2+} and Mg^{2+} ions as aragonite and brucite, so their concentrations are typically much lower than mean ocean values. Modelling work in relation to Hadean systems indicates that hydrothermal concentrations of Ca^{2+} and Mg^{2+} would likely have been <1 mM, which is in the range that enhanced phosphorylation here. Other conditions considered here, including salinity and high pressure, would have only limited effects on ATP synthesis in submarine hydrothermal systems (which typically have pressures in the range of 100 to 300 Bars). Alkaline hydrothermal systems might also have generated Fe^{3+} in situ for ADP phosphorylation. Thermodynamic modelling shows that the mixing of alkaline hydrothermal fluids with seawater in submarine systems can promote continuous cycling between ferrous and ferric iron, potentially forming soluble hydrous ferric chlorides, which our experiments show have the same effect as ferric sulphate".

=== Montmorillonite bubbles ===
Another group suggests that primitive cells might have formed inside inorganic clay microcompartments, which can provide an ideal container for the synthesis and compartmentalization of complex organic molecules. Clay-armored bubbles form naturally when particles of montmorillonite clay collect on the outer surface of air bubbles under water. This creates a semi permeable vesicle from materials that are readily available in the environment. The authors remark that montmorillonite is known to serve as a chemical catalyst, encouraging lipids to form membranes and single nucleotides to join into strands of RNA. Primitive reproduction can be envisioned when the clay bubbles burst, releasing the lipid membrane-bound product into the surrounding medium.

=== Membraneless droplets ===
Another way to form primitive compartments that may lead to the formation of a protocell is through polyester membraneless structures that have the ability to host biochemicals (proteins and RNA) and/or scaffold the assemblies of lipids around them. While these droplets are leaky towards genetic materials, this leakiness could have facilitated the progenote hypothesis.

=== Coacervates ===
Researchers have also proposed early encapsulation in aqueous phase-separated droplets called coacervates. These droplets are driven by the accumulation of macromolecules, producing a distinct dense phase liquid droplet within a more dilute liquid medium. These droplets can propagate, retaining their internal composition, through shear forces and turbulence in the medium, and could have acted as a means of replicating encapsulation for an early protocell. However, replication was highly disordered and droplet fusion is common, calling into question coacervates true potential for distinct compartmentalization leading to competition and early Darwinian-selection.

== Sexual reproduction ==
Eigen et al. and Woese proposed that the genomes of early protocells were composed of single-stranded RNA, and that individual genes corresponded to separate RNA segments, rather than being linked end-to-end as in present-day DNA genomes. A protocell that was haploid (one copy of each RNA gene) would be vulnerable to damage, since a single lesion in any RNA segment would be potentially lethal to the protocell (e.g. by blocking replication or inhibiting the function of an essential gene).

Vulnerability to damage could be reduced by maintaining two or more copies of each RNA segment in each protocell, i.e. by maintaining diploidy or polyploidy. Genome redundancy would allow a damaged RNA segment to be replaced by an additional replication of its homolog. For such a simple organism, the proportion of available resources tied up in the genetic material would be a large fraction of the total resource budget. Under limited resource conditions, the protocell reproductive rate would likely be inversely related to ploidy number, and the protocell's fitness would be reduced by the costs of redundancy. Consequently, coping with damaged RNA genes while minimizing the costs of redundancy would likely have been a fundamental problem for early protocells.

A cost-benefit analysis was carried out in which the costs of maintaining redundancy were balanced against the costs of genome damage. This analysis led to the conclusion that, under a wide range of circumstances, the selected strategy would be for each protocell to be haploid, but to periodically fuse with another haploid protocell to form a transient diploid. The retention of the haploid state maximizes the growth rate. The periodic fusions permit mutual reactivation of otherwise lethally damaged protocells. If at least one damage-free copy of each RNA gene is present in the transient diploid, viable progeny can be formed. For two, rather than one, viable daughter cells to be produced would require an extra replication of the intact RNA gene homologous to any RNA gene that had been damaged prior to the division of the fused protocell. The cycle of haploid reproduction, with occasional fusion to a transient diploid state, followed by splitting to the haploid state, can be considered to be the sexual cycle in its most primitive form. In the absence of this sexual cycle, haploid protocells with damage in an essential RNA gene would simply die.

This model for the early sexual cycle is hypothetical, but it is very similar to the known sexual behavior of the segmented RNA viruses, which are among the simplest organisms known. The influenza virus, whose genome consists of 8 physically separated single-stranded RNA segments, is an example of this type of virus. In segmented RNA viruses, "mating" can occur when a host cell is infected by at least two virus particles. If these viruses each contain an RNA segment with a lethal damage, multiple infection can lead to reactivation providing that at least one undamaged copy of each virus gene is present in the infected cell. This phenomenon is known as "multiplicity reactivation". Multiplicity reactivation has been reported to occur in influenza virus infections after induction of RNA damage by UV-irradiation, and ionizing radiation.

== Artificial models ==
=== Langmuir–Blodgett deposition ===
Starting with a technique commonly used to deposit molecules on a solid surface, Langmuir–Blodgett deposition, scientists are able to assemble phospholipid membranes of arbitrary complexity layer by layer. These artificial phospholipid membranes support functional insertion both of purified and of in situ expressed membrane proteins. The technique could help astrobiologists understand how the first living cells originated.

=== Jeewanu protocells ===
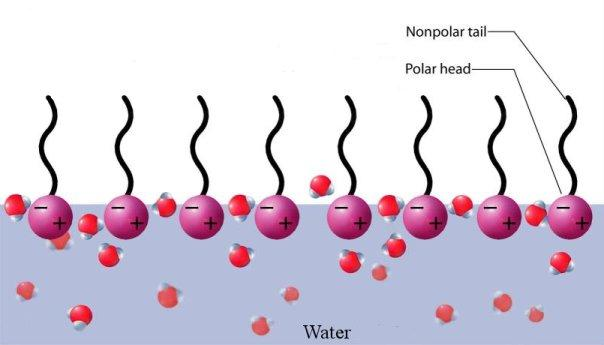
Surfactant molecules arranged on an air–water interface

Jeewanu protocells are synthetic chemical particles that possess cell-like structure and seem to have some functional living properties. First synthesized in 1963 from simple minerals and basic organics while exposed to sunlight, it is still reported to have some metabolic capabilities, the presence of semipermeable membrane, amino acids, phospholipids, carbohydrates and RNA-like molecules. The nature and properties of the Jeewanu remains to be clarified.

In a similar synthesis experiment a frozen mixture of water, methanol, ammonia and carbon monoxide was exposed to ultraviolet (UV) radiation. This combination yielded large amounts of organic material that self-organised to form globules or vesicles when immersed in water. The investigating scientist considered these globules to resemble cell membranes that enclose and concentrate the chemistry of life, separating their interior from the outside world. The globules were between 10 and 40 micrometres (0.00039 and 0.00157 in), or about the size of red blood cells. Remarkably, the globules fluoresced, or glowed, when exposed to UV light. Absorbing UV and converting it into visible light in this way was considered one possible way of providing energy to a primitive cell. If such globules played a role in the origin of life, the fluorescence could have been a precursor to primitive photosynthesis. Such fluorescence also provides the benefit of acting as a sunscreen, diffusing any damage that otherwise would be inflicted by UV radiation. Such a protective function would have been vital for life on the early Earth, since the ozone layer, which blocks out the sun's most destructive UV rays, did not form until after photosynthetic life began to produce oxygen.

=== Bio-like structures ===
The synthesis of three kinds of "jeewanu" have been reported; two of them were organic, and the other was inorganic. Other similar inorganic structures have also been produced. The investigating scientist (V. O. Kalinenko) referred to them as "bio-like structures" and "artificial cells". Formed in distilled water (as well as on agar gel) under the influence of an electric field, they lack protein, amino acids, purine or pyrimidine bases, and certain enzyme activities. According to NASA researchers, "presently known scientific principles of biology and biochemistry cannot account for living inorganic units" and "the postulated existence of these living units has not been proved".

=== Analogous Research: Fuel Cells ===
In March 2014, NASA's Jet Propulsion Laboratory demonstrated a unique way to study the origins of life: fuel cells. Fuel cells are similar to biological cells in that electrons are also transferred to and from molecules. In both cases, this results in electricity and power. The study of fuel cells suggest that an important factor in protocell development was that the Earth provides electrical energy at the seafloor. "This energy could have kick-started life and could have sustained life after it arose. Now, we have a way of testing different materials and environments that could have helped life arise not just on Earth, but possibly on Mars, Europa and other places in the Solar System."

== Ethics, controversy, and research considerations ==
Protocell research has raised ethical and safety concerns. Perhaps the most pressing ethical question is whether creating a new form of life violates our moral intuitions against "playing God". The primary risk of protocell research is the creation and subsequent release of self-replicating protocells into the environment. These cells might wreak ecological havoc or even become pathogens for which existing life has no defense.

Work in synthetic biology has led to debate about the line between modified natural life and artificial life and the line between life and non-life. There is controversy over whether any experiments so far should be considered truly artificial life.

Experiments with protocells may continue to refine our ideas about the origin of life. The creation of a variety of protocell forms, in different environments and conditions and using different methods, allows scientists to actually test hypotheses about how life could have formed, rather than simply conjecturing.

== See also ==
- Abiogenesis – Life arising from non-living matter
- Artificial cell – Engineered component of a biological cell
- Earliest known life forms
- Emergence – Unpredictable phenomenon in complex systems
- Entropy and life – Influence of thermodynamics on evolution
- First universal common ancestor – Possible earliest ancestor of the LUCA ancestral cell
- Last universal ancestor – Ancestor of all current life on Earth
- Pre-cell – Hypothetical life before complete cells
- Protocell Circus, a film
- Pseudo-panspermia
- RNA world hypothesis – Hypothetical stage in the early evolutionary history of life on Earth
- Synthetic biology – Interdisciplinary branch of biology and engineering
