= Facial expression =

Expression of face

Facial expression is a motion and positioning of the muscles beneath the skin of the face. These movements convey the emotional state of an individual to observers and are a form of nonverbal communication. They are a primary means of conveying social information between humans, but they also occur in most other mammals and some other animal species.

Humans can adopt a facial expression voluntarily or involuntarily, and the neural mechanisms responsible for controlling the expression differ in each case. Voluntary facial expressions are often socially conditioned and follow a cortical route in the brain. Conversely, involuntary facial expressions are believed to be innate and follow a subcortical route in the brain. Facial recognition can be an emotional experience for the brain and the amygdala is highly involved in the recognition process.

Beyond the accessory nature of facial expressions in spoken communication between people, they play a significant role in communication with sign language. Many phrases in sign language include facial expressions.

There is controversy surrounding the question of whether facial expressions are a worldwide and universal display among humans.

== Creation ==
=== Facial muscles ===
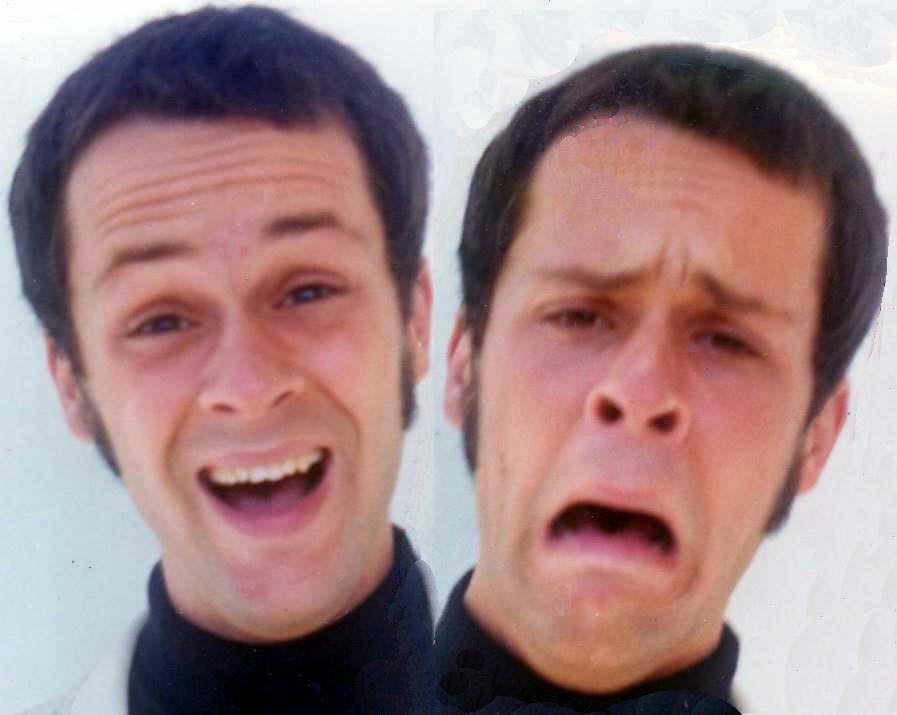
An actor acting out Drama Masks (Thalia and Melpomene) in 1972

Facial expressions are vital to social communication between humans. They are caused by the movement of muscles that connect to the skin and fascia in the face. These muscles move the skin, creating lines and folds and causing the movement of facial features, such as the mouth and eyebrows. These muscles develop from the second pharyngeal arch in the embryo. The temporalis, masseter, and internal and external pterygoid muscles, which are mainly used for chewing, have a minor effect on expression as well. These muscles develop from the first pharyngeal arch.

=== Neuronal pathways ===
There are two brain pathways associated with facial expression; the first is voluntary expression. Voluntary expression travels from the primary motor cortex through the pyramidal tract, specifically the corticobulbar projections. The cortex is associated with display rules in emotion, which are social precepts that influence and modify expressions. Cortically related expressions are made consciously.

The second type of expression is emotional. These expressions originate from the extrapyramidal motor system, which involves subcortical nuclei. For this reason, genuine emotions are not associated with the cortex and are often displayed unconsciously. This is demonstrated in infants before the age of two; they display distress, disgust, interest, anger, contempt, surprise, and fear. Infants' displays of these emotions indicate that they are not cortically related. Similarly, blind children also display emotions, proving that they are subconscious rather than learned. Other subcortical facial expressions include the "knit brow" during concentration, raised eyebrows when listening attentively, and short "punctuation" expressions to add emphasis during speech. People can be unaware that they are producing these expressions.

=== Asymmetries ===
The lower portions of the face are controlled by the opposite cerebral hemisphere, causing asymmetric facial expression. Because the right hemisphere is more specialized for emotional expression, emotions are more strongly expressed on the left side of the face, particularly for negative emotions. Asymmetries in expression can be seen in chimeric faces (facial portraits made by combining the left and right halves of faces with different expressions) and also in portraits which more often show the left, more emotional side of the face than the right.

== Neural mechanisms in face perception ==
The amygdala plays an important role in facial recognition. Functional imaging studies have found that when shown pictures of faces, there is a large increase in the activity of the amygdala. The amygdala receives visual information from the thalamus via the sub cortical pathways. The amygdala may also have a significant role in the recognition of fear and negative emotions. It is believed that the emotion disgust is recognized through activation of the insula and basal ganglia. The recognition of emotion may also utilize the occipitotemporal neocortex, orbitofrontal cortex and right frontoparietal cortices.

=== Gender and facial cues ===
More than anything though, what shapes a child's cognitive ability to detect facial expression is being exposed to it from the time of birth. The more an infant is exposed to different faces and expressions, the more able they are to recognize these emotions and then mimic them for themselves. Infants are exposed to an array of emotional expressions from birth, and evidence indicates that they imitate some facial expressions and gestures (e.g., tongue protrusion) as early as the first few days of life. In addition, gender affects the tendency to express, perceive, remember, and forget specific emotions. For instance, angry male faces and happy female faces are more recognizable, compared to happy male faces and angry female faces.

== Communication ==
A 2020 study on "emotion residue" found that even when study participants attempted to make neutral facial expressions, their faces still retained emotion residue from prior expressions, and these prior expressions were able to be detected by observers.

A 1988 study on the "facial feedback" hypothesis found that study participants' mood was improved when they smiled. However, this study later failed a large replication attempt.

One experiment investigated the influence of gaze direction and facial expression on face memory. Participants were shown a set of unfamiliar faces with either happy or angry facial expressions, which were either gazing straight ahead or had their gaze averted to one side. Memory for faces that were initially shown with angry expressions was found to be poorer when these faces had averted as opposed to direct gaze, whereas memory for individuals shown with happy faces was unaffected by gaze direction. It is suggested that memory for another individual's face partly depends on an evaluation of the behavioral intention of that individual.

A 2025 study from Nottingham Trent University in England found that people who were facially expressive were more liked by social partners, which may be one reason why people produce, on average, 101 facial movements per minute during a given social interaction.

=== Multimodal communication ===
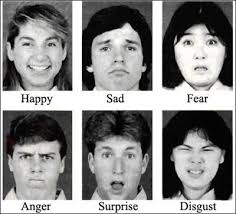
Facial expressions help us recognize emotions

Researchers have suggested that facial expressions are often interpreted in conjunction with other forms of communication. In everyday interactions, people often rely on facial expressions. vocal tone, and speech content simultaneously to help interpret another person's emotions. Relying on multiple communication channels may provide an individual with additional information that helps interpret and understand another person's emotional state more accurately.

One study used video recordings of actors telling emotional stories using varying degrees of facial expressions, vocal tone, and speech content. The researchers found that emotional recognition was strongest when all three channels conveyed the same emotion. The study also suggested that participants experienced a greater degree of empathy when facial expressions, vocal tones, and speech content expressed the same emotion message. When even one of the communication channels was neutral or missing, the study showed that emotion recognition and empathy decreased.

=== Eye contact ===
A person's face, especially their eyes, creates the most obvious and immediate cues that lead to the formation of impressions. This article discusses eyes and facial expressions and the effect they have on interpersonal communication.

A person's eyes reveal much about how they are feeling, or what they are thinking. Blink rate can reveal how nervous or at ease a person may be. Research by Boston College professor Joe Tecce suggests that stress levels are revealed by blink rates. He supports his data with statistics on the relation between the blink rates of presidential candidates and their success in their races. Tecce claims that the faster blinker in the presidential debates has lost every election since 1980. Though Tecce's data is interesting, it is important to recognize that non-verbal communication is multi-channeled, and focusing on only one aspect is reckless. Nervousness can also be measured by examining each candidates' perspiration, eye contact and stiffness.

Within their first year, Infants learn rapidly that the looking behaviors of others convey significant information. Infants prefer to look at faces that engage them in mutual gaze and that, from an early age, healthy babies show enhanced neural processing of direct gaze.

Eye contact is another major aspect of facial communication. Some have hypothesized that this is due to infancy, as humans are one of the few mammals who maintain regular eye contact with their mother while nursing. Eye contact serves a variety of purposes. It regulates conversations, shows interest or involvement, and establishes a connection with others.

But different cultures have different rules for eye contact. Certain Asian cultures can perceive direct eye contact as a way to signal competitiveness, which in many situations may prove to be inappropriate. Others lower their eyes to signal respect, and similarly, eye contact is avoided in Nigeria; however, in western cultures this could be misinterpreted as lacking self-confidence.

Even beyond the idea of eye contact, eyes communicate more data than a person even consciously expresses. Pupil dilation is a significant cue to a level of excitement, pleasure, or attraction. Dilated pupils indicate greater affection or attraction, while constricted pupils send a colder signal.

=== Dynamic facial expressions ===
Researchers have traditionally studied facial expressions by using static photographs in their studies. In real-life communication, people do not see frozen facial expressions. Instead, in a real conversation, you see the face transition from one emotion to the next. Unlike static photographs, dynamic facial expressions allow an observer to view the development of an expression as it changes from a neutral expression to a fully expressed emotion. Dynamic facial expressions develop and change over time. Some researchers have argued that because of this, dynamic facial expressions may provide additional information about someone's emotional state that cannot be captured by a single photograph.

Watching an expression develop over time allows observers to witness the progression, timing, and intensity of an emotional response. This may contribute to a more accurate interpretation of a person's emotional state.

Jones, Gutierrez, and Ludlow conducted a study involving two groups of children, one group was deaf children and the other was hearing children. In this study, they compared static and dynamic facial expressions and how accurately children could recognize the emotion being displayed. In this study, deaf children identified emotional expressions more accurately when viewing the dynamic facial expressions than they did when shown the static photographs. Hearing children showed little difference between the two formats. However, as the intensity of the emotion being shown increased, the accuracy of emotional recognition also increased.

Based on these findings, Jones, Gutierrez, and Ludlow suggested that dynamic facial expressions may provide additional information and have begun increasing the use of video stimuli in research over photographs, as dynamic facial expressions more closely reflect real-world communication.

=== Sign languages ===
Facial expression is used in sign languages to convey specific meanings. In American Sign Language (ASL), for instance, raised eyebrows combined with a slightly forward head tilt to indicate that what is being signed is a yes–no question. Lowered eyebrows are used for wh-word questions. Facial expression is also used in sign languages to show adverbs and adjectives such as distance or size: an open mouth, squinted eyes and tilted back head indicate something far while the mouth pulled to one side and the cheek held toward the shoulder indicate something close, and puffed cheeks mean very large. It can also show the manner in which something is done, such as carelessly or routinely. Some of these expressions, also called non-manual signs, are used similarly in different sign languages while others are different from one language to another. For example, the expression used for 'carelessly' in ASL means 'boring or unpleasant' in British Sign Language.

== Challenges with facial expression recognition ==
Researchers have identified several factors that can reduce the accuracy of facial expression recognition. Factors such as movement, lighting, facial obstructions, and individual differences can all interfere with accurate emotion interpretation. Real faces vary significantly in age, facial structure, and the intensity with which people express emotions. Everyday facial expressions are usually more subtle and less exaggerated. Poor or uneven lighting may make facial features harder to interpret, while obstructions such as glasses, hair, and shadows may further limit the accuracy of facial expression recognition.

Research suggests that some emotions are more easily recognized. Emotions such as happiness and sadness are more reliably identified, while others, including anger, may be more difficult to recognize and are often misidentified. One proposed reason for this difference in recognition is that certain emotions share overlapping facial characteristics. Research also suggests that laboratory studies often use controlled conditions such as lighting, poses, and movement, which may result in a higher recognition accuracy than would be expected in real-world environments.

== Universality hypothesis ==
The universality hypothesis is the assumption that certain facial expressions and face-related acts or events are signals of specific emotions and are recognized by people regardless of culture, language, or time. Examples include happiness, signaled with laughter and smiling, sadness, signaled with tears, anger with a clenched jaw, fear with a grimace or gurn, surprise with raised eyebrows and wide eyes along with a slight retraction of the ears, and disgust with a wrinkled nose and squinted eyes. These are all emotions with limited social components. Conversely, emotions like shame, pride, jealousy, and deference are not expressed consistently across cultures. The belief in the evolutionary basis of these kinds of facial expressions can be traced back to Darwin's The Expression of the Emotions in Man and Animals. Reviews of the universality hypothesis have been both supportive and critical. Work in 2013 by Nelson and Russell and Jack et al. has been especially critical.

=== Support ===
Ekman's work on facial expressions had its starting point in the work of psychologist Silvan Tomkins. Ekman showed that facial expressions of emotion are not culturally determined, but universal across human cultures.

To demonstrate his universality hypothesis, Ekman ran a test on a group of the South Fore people of New Guinea, a pre-industrial culture that was isolated from the West. The experiment participants were told brief stories about emotional events (happiness, sadness, anger, fear, surprise, and disgust). After each story, they were asked to select the matching facial expression from an array of three faces. The Fore selected the "correct" face on 64–90% of trials but had difficulty distinguishing the fear face from the surprise face. Children selected from an array of only two faces, and their results were similar to the adults'. Subsequent cross-cultural studies found similar results

=== Criticism ===
Both sides of this debate agree that the face expresses emotion. The controversy surrounds the uncertainty about what specific emotional information is read from a facial expression. Opponents of the universality hypothesis believe that more general information is pieced together with other contextual information in order to determine how a person feels.

One argument against the evidence presented in support of the universality hypothesis is that the method typically used to demonstrate universality inflates recognition scores. Although each factor may contribute only a small amount to the inflation, combined, they can produce exaggerated scores. The three main factors are the following:

- The universality hypothesis focuses on people's abilities to recognize spontaneous facial expressions as they occur naturally. However, the facial expressions used to test this hypothesis are posed. Studies of spontaneous facial expressions are rare and find that participants' recognition of the expressions is lower than that of the corresponding posed expressions.
- In most studies, participants are shown more than one facial expression (Ekman recommends six of each expression). However, people judge facial expressions relative to others that they have seen, and participants who judge more than one facial expression have higher recognition rates than those who judge only one.
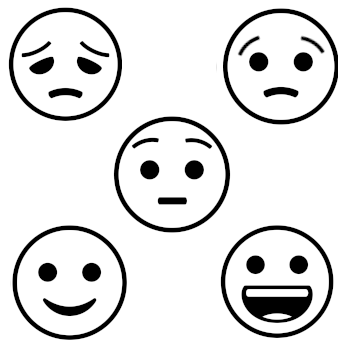
- Emoji's commonly used in forced choice methods
  The response format that is most commonly used in emotion recognition studies is forced choice. In forced choice, for each facial expression, participants are asked to select their response from a short list of emotion labels. The forced choice method determines the emotion attributed to the facial expressions via the labels that are presented. That is, participants will select the best match to the facial expression even if it is not the emotion label they would have provided spontaneously and even if they would not have labeled the expression as an emotion at all.

=== Evolutionary significance of universality ===
Darwin argued that the expression of emotions has evolved in humans from animal ancestors, who would have used similar methods of expression. Darwin believed that expressions were unlearned and innate in human nature and were therefore evolutionarily significant for survival. He compiled supporting evidence from his research on different cultures, on infants, and in other animal species. Ekman found that people from different cultures recognized certain facial expressions despite vast cultural differences, and his findings tended to confirm Darwin's initial hypothesis.

Cross-cultural studies had shown that there are similarities in the way emotions are expressed across diverse cultures, but studies have even shown that there are similarities between species in how emotions are expressed. Research has shown that chimpanzees are able to communicate many of the same facial expressions as humans through the complex movements of the facial muscles. In fact, the facial cues were so similar that Ekman's Facial Action Coding System could be applied to the chimps in evaluating their expressions. Of course, differences between the species' physical facial properties, such as white sclera and everted lips in chimps, would mean that some expressions could not be compared.

Similarly, Darwin observed that infants' method of expression for certain emotions was instinctive, as they were able to display emotional expressions they had not themselves yet witnessed. Facial morphology impacts expression recognition in important ways, and therefore, infant facial morphology may also serve some specific communicative function. These similarities in morphology and movement are important for the correct interpretation of an emotion.

Darwin was particularly interested in the functions of facial expression as evolutionarily important for survival. He looked at the functions of facial expression in terms of the utility of expression in the life of the animal and in terms of specific expressions within species. Darwin deduced that some animals communicated feelings of different emotional states with specific facial expressions. He further concluded that this communication was important for the survival of animals in group-dwelling species; the skill to effectively communicate or interpret another animal's feelings and behaviors would be a principal trait in naturally fit species. However, this suggests that solitary species such as orangutans would not exhibit such expressions.

For a discussion of the controversies on these claims, see Fridlund and Russell & Fernandez Dols.

== See also ==
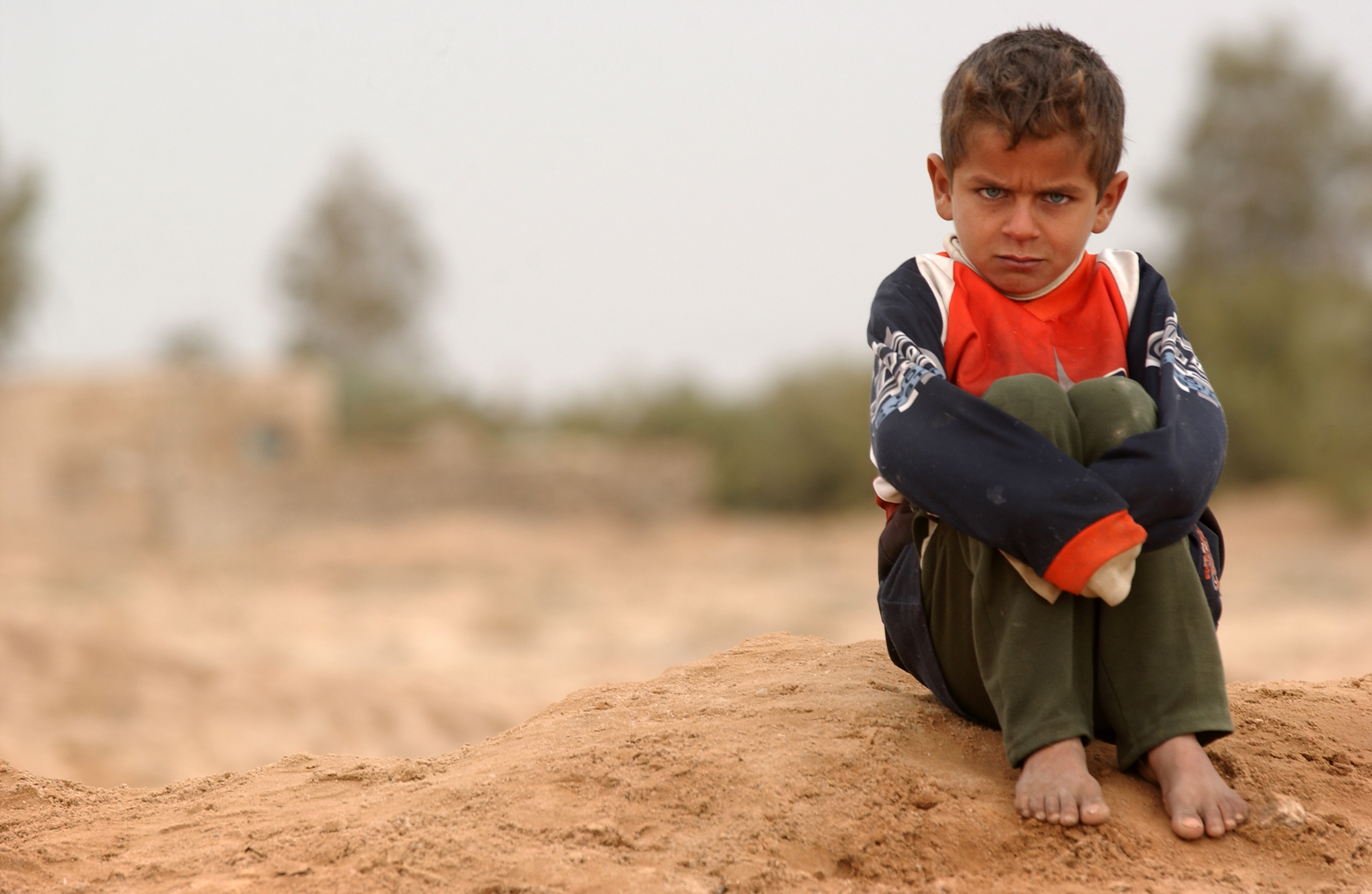
A boy displays an angry pout.

- Affect display
- Bell's palsy
- Body language
- Computer processing of body language
  - Facial expression capture
  - Facial expression databases
  - Facial expression detection
  - Facial recognition system
- Display rules
- Emoticon (Facial Expression Markup Language)
- Emotion classification
- Laughter
- Gelotology
- Metacommunicative competence
- Thought Moments
