= Blood barrier =

Blood barrier may refer to:

- Blood–air barrier
- Blood–brain barrier
- Blood–ocular barrier
- Blood–retinal barrier
- Blood–testis barrier
- Blood–thymus barrier
- Blood-placental barrier
