= Biological barrier =

A biological barrier is a natural selectively permeable membrane that protects certain organs or tissues by allowing some substances to pass through them, and blocking entry of other substances.

It can refer to:

- Blood-brain barrier, a biological barrier that prevents entry of harmful substances into the brain by selectively allowing some substances to pass through it
- Blood-testis barrier, the biological barrier between blood and testes
- Blood-placental barrier, the biological barrier between a pregnant individual's blood and foetal blood (blood of one or more foetuses)
- Blood-CSF barrier, the biological barrier between blood and cerebrospinal fluid (CSF; also called brain fluid)
- Blood–spinal cord barrier, the biological barrier between blood and the spinal cord
- Blood–saliva barrier, the biological barrier between blood and saliva
