= Blood–spinal cord barrier =

Semipermeable anatomical interface

The blood–spinal cord barrier (BSCB) is a semipermeable anatomical interface that consists of the specialized small blood vessels that surround the spinal cord. While similar to the blood–brain barrier in function and morphology, it is physiologically independent and has several distinct characteristics. The BSCB is involved in many disorders affecting the central nervous system, including neurodegenerative diseases, pain disorders, and traumatic spinal cord injury. In conjunction with the blood–brain barrier, the BSCB contributes to the difficulty in delivering drugs to the central nervous system, which makes drug targeting of the BSCB an important goal in pharmaceutical research.

== Anatomy and physiology ==
The primary function of the BSCB is to protect the spinal cord from potentially toxic substances within the blood while still delivering necessary molecules to maintain spinal cord activities. The BSCB consists of endothelial cells, a basal membrane, pericytes, and astrocyte endfeet. The endothelial cells have highly exclusionary tight junctions that prohibit most molecules from passing between cells and form specialized capillaries that, unlike capillaries in the periphery, lack fenestrations, have more mitochondria, and contain limited endocytic vesicles. The lack of fenestrations and endocytic vesicles reflects the restricted transcellular flow, while the increased number of mitochondria contributes to a high metabolic rate in these endothelial cells. Surrounding the BSCB capillaries is a basal membrane (also called the basal lamina) that contains pericytes. The basal membrane is formed and maintained by all cell types in the BSCB and contributes to the cytoskeletal morphology of the endothelial cells, which affects the integrity of tight junctions and, by extension, the BSCB. Pericytes are microcirculatory cells that, in the BSCB, regulate the proliferation, migration, and differentiation of endothelial cells. Finally, astrocytes within spinal cord tissue extend endfoot processes that surround the outer surface of the capillaries. Astrocytes are critically important for developing and maintaining the neuroprotective mechanisms of BSCB endothelial cells. They release secretory compounds that influence the phenotype of endothelial cells and express aquaporin and potassium channels that help regulate ion concentration and fluid volume within the spinal cord.

The anatomy of the BSCB is very similar to the anatomy of the blood–brain barrier (BBB); however many key differences exist between the two that affect both the maintenance of healthy tissue and development of pathophysiology within the central nervous system (CNS). In general, the BSCB is more permeable than the BBB, largely due to the relatively low expression of tight junction proteins like ZO-1 and occludin. For example, mannitol, an osmotic diuretic, crosses BSCB endothelium more readily than it does BBB endothelium. Cytokines are also able to pass through the BSCB with more ease, making it more vulnerable to disruption and inflammation relative to the BBB. This vulnerability to disruption leaves the spinal cord susceptible to toxins that can inflict tissue damage. Susceptibility to toxins is already increased in BSCB endothelium through the relative downregulation of the critical efflux protein p-glycoprotein, thus slowing elimination of the toxins that penetrate the barrier. Overall, the differences between the BSCB and the BBB result in vulnerability to certain diseases and disorders affecting the CNS.

== Implication in disease ==
Research shows that the BSCB plays a significant role in the development and progression of neurodegenerative diseases, spinal cord injury, pain conditions, and other disorders that affect the CNS. Because of its function as a protective barrier for the spinal cord, disruption of the BSCB exposes spinal cord tissue to inflammatory signals, pathogens, and toxins.

=== Spinal cord injury ===
Spinal cord injuries (SCIs) are debilitating incurable conditions that frequently result in lifelong disability and dysfunction. They occur when a mechanical force is applied to the spinal column, most often from motor vehicle accidents and falls. This impact disrupts the capillaries around the spinal cord and initiates many pathophysiological cascades by allowing the molecules and cells within the bloodstream to enter nervous tissue. Within five minutes following the initial injury, normally impermeable blood components like the large molecule albumin or red blood cells can be detected in spinal cord tissue. Because of this sudden infiltration of normally absent particles, an inflammatory response is triggered by astrocytes and microglia that extends the initial injury into previously uncompromised segments of cord. This secondary injury can contribute heavily to long term loss of function and disability.

Because the disruption of the BSCB is a major exacerbating factor in SCIs, reestablishment of normal function is critical to reducing the severity of injury outcomes. Some studies in rats with induced SCIs have shown that reestablishment can occur as early as 14 days following the initial injury; however, other studies have shown the BSCB can be compromised as long as 56 days after injury. Depending on the type and severity of the injury inducing force, the time it takes the BSCB to reestablish itself varies. For example, if the initial injury includes excessive separation of the basement membrane from the blood vessels, a space is created that can accommodate more immune cells and thus propagate damaging inflammation. Additionally, widening of the tight junctions adhering endothelial cells and oxidative stress are both associated with a long-term increase in BSCB permeability. Inflammation, compromised tight junctions, and oxidative stress are all contributors to a severe complication of SCI called post-traumatic syringomyelia. In post-traumatic syringomyelia, the structural and function loss of integrity of the BSCB encourages the development of fluid filled cysts within the spinal cord, causing pain and worsening disability. As such, the sooner the BSCB is restored, the better the prognosis is for someone after a SCI.

=== Neurodegenerative disease ===
BSCB disruption has been found as a predecessor and possible initiator for certain neurodegenerative diseases, though the mechanisms by which this occurs are not fully understood.

Amyotrophic lateral sclerosis (ALS) is a chronic, progressive, and ultimately fatal neurodegenerative disease that is caused by the death of motor neurons in the brain and spinal cord. These motor neurons control voluntary movements, so their degradation and death lead to symptoms like difficulty moving, weakness, trouble speaking and swallowing, muscle cramping, and muscle twitching that worsen over time. Only 5-10% of ALS cases have an identifiable cause, most often is a mutation in the gene SOD1. Regardless of whether the cause is idiopathic or genetic, ALS is associated with significant dysfunction of the endothelium and basement membrane of the CNS, with the BSCB being more effected than the BBB. Patients with ALS have been found to have decreased expression of certain proteins, like ZO-1 or claudin-5, that weaken the integrity of the tight junctions. The membranes of endothelial cells have increased permeability, and this may contribute more to pathology than the tight junctions being compromised. Furthermore, studies with rat models have shown that the initial phases of ALS result in a loss of 10-15% of the BSCB capillary length, edema, and collapsed capillary beds. These vasculature changes preceded motor neuron death, indicating that BSCB breakdown may facilitate tissue damage.

With the endothelium compromised, proteins and antibodies can infiltrate the cerebrospinal fluid (CSF). Proteins like albumin and antibodies like IgG are too large to pass through the BSCB on their own, so their presence in CSF indicates a leaky endothelium. These blood compounds are toxic to nervous tissue and precipitate neuroinflammation, edema, and eventual motor neuron death.

Multiple sclerosis (MS), a neurodegenerative, autoimmune disease that deteriorates the myelin sheath coating axons and causes permanent damage to nerves, has also been associated with capillary and barrier dysfunction. Many studies support the idea that CNS barrier disruption precedes MS, particularly through altered tight junction protein expression. Weakened tight junctions cause fragility in the barrier that can lead to immune system invasion, demyelination, and axonal damage. The BSCB is more susceptible to immune invasion because tight junctions are weak by default, relative to the BBB. Neutrophils are among the first immune cells found in early MS pathology; through their role as potent modulators of dendritic cell recruitment and function, they initiate an immune response that ultimately results in T-cell activation and infiltration. As such, decreased population of neutrophils correlates strongly with decreased MS pathology, indicating that strengthening of BSCB tight junctions may be a useful therapeutic target.

=== Neuropathic pain ===
Neuropathy is a type of severe chronic pain that is caused by disease and dysfunction of the somatosensory system that allows for perception of touch, pain, vibration, and other sensations. Many conditions can cause neuropathy, including diabetes, HIV, SCI, transverse myelitis, MS, amputation, peripheral nerve pain. At its core, neuropathy occurs when the central excitatory and inhibitory nerves in the somatosensory system are altered in some way, as this leads to dysfunctional sensory signaling. Triggering changes in the pain signaling pathway occurs the neuroimmune interactions, such as the release of proinflammatory mediators into the spinal cord that are known to promote central sensitization (wherein sensory nerves are activated more easily) and hyperalgesia (increased sensitivity to pain). The BSCB is the main anatomical structure that regulates the interaction between the immune system and the nervous system, so its role in neuropathy is of pharmacological interest.

While it does not occur in all cases, some people who experience peripheral nerve injury develop neuropathy through the signaling induced by the injury. It results in increased BSCB permeability that allows white blood cells to migrate into the spinal cord, where they can release mediators that alter function. This forms a positive feedback loop: an injury causes cytokines, a type of signaling molecule, to be released, which induces BSCB disruption that allows white blood cell migration, followed by the white blood cells releasing more cytokines within the spinal cord, keeping the BSCB hyperpermeable. It has been found that blocking the signaling of certain cytokines in cases of neuropathy attenuates the BSCB permeability, decreases the amount of infiltrating immune cells, and ultimately decreases hyperalgesia.

== Current treatment strategies and challenges of drug delivery ==
Similar to the BBB, the majority of small molecule drugs and virtually all large molecule and biological drugs cannot penetrate the BSCB, making treatment of spinal cord diseases difficult. Furthermore, drugs that do pass through the barrier may be subjected to efflux by specialized efflux pumps such as p-glycoprotein and breast-cancer resistance protein, which prevents concentration of therapeutic relevance being reached. Because of this, the majority of nervous system disorders have limited treatments that may involve invasive means of administration.

There are two major pharmacological goals regarding drug delivery to the CNS: the first is finding ways to repair CNS tissue (including the BBB and BSCB) after it has been damaged, and the second is creating methods of drug delivery that improve therapy. If a drug is capable of crossing the BBB or BSCB, then it can be administered orally, rectally, intravenously, etc. However, for drugs that cannot cross the BBB/BSCB, there must be either a method of bypassing the barriers or the creation of a drug delivery system that allows penetration. Methods of bypassing the BSCB directly include intrathecal injection (into the spinal canal), intracerebroventricular injection (into the ventricles of the brain, which produce CSF that flows down the CNS), epidural injection (into the epidural space), and depot or implant placement, such as a placement of a catheter.

Regarding current treatment strategies for CNS diseases, there is unfortunately no cure for most damaging afflictions of the spinal cord. Treatment is generally aimed at reducing symptoms and slowing progression of disease. In MS, treatment centers around immunomodulatory drugs that can cross the BBB/BSCB. Corticosteroids are a common choice, as they can modulate immune function and decrease symptom severity during an attack. Some anti-cancer drugs, like mitoxantrone and cyclophosphamide, have immunosuppressant effects that slow disease progression. In ALS, only two drugs are approved to slow progression and they are incapable of reversing symptoms once they arise: masitinib, which prevents abnormal glial cells from activating and proliferating, and ibudilast, which inhibits cytokine release form activated microglia. Both drugs have been shown to slow degeneration and improve overall survival time, though it is of utmost importance to begin treatment as early as possible. Antiepileptics are sometimes given off-label for ALS, since hyperexcitability is thought to contribute to motor neuron death; no antiepileptic has been approved for this use, though. Neuropathic conditions can be managed with pharmaceutically with anticonvulsants, antidepressants, and opioids; however, other treatments involving neuromodulation (deep brain stimulation, motor cortex stimulation, spinal cord stimulation, etc.) have shown efficacy in reducing pain.

== Current research ==
Most pharmaceutical research involving the BSCB aims to find efficient methods of overcoming its barrier mechanism to improve drug delivery. This can include directly bypassing the barrier, such as by placing a drug-eluting depot or injecting directly into the CNS, preventing efflux, such as with p-glycoprotein inhibitors, or by enhancing drug penetration.

=== Disruption ===
The BBB/BSCB can be deliberately disrupted to increase paracellular transport of drugs to the CNS. An established method of accomplishing this is through osmotic disruption. CSF is nearly isosmotic to blood, so if a hyperosmotic agent, such as mannitol, is administered intravascularly, the osmolarity gap between the blood and CSF widens, resulting in fluid flow from CNS tissue into blood vessels. Hyperosmotic agents are already in clinical use as diuretics, though mannitol is also approved to treat increased intracranial pressure, as it draws fluid out of the brain and thus decreases the volume-induced pressure. However, hyperosmolarity may also be of use in drug delivery since it causes the membranes of endothelial cells to shrink, resulting in tight junctions stretching and paracellular gaps widening. Widened paracellular gaps can facilitate passage of larger molecules that otherwise would be unable to cross the BBB/BSCB. This method is not commonly used due to adverse effects such as dehydration and, in some cases, exacerbation of injury.

=== Nanoparticles ===
Nanoparticles are composed of nano-sized particles that have widespread medical application. There are different types of nanoparticle, including polymeric (natural and artificial), liposomal/lipid-based, and inorganic. The most relevant nanoparticle type to treating CNS disease are lipid-based nanoparticles, as the lipophilicity of the particle allows for higher permeability in the BBB/BSCB. The goal of nanoparticles in this context are to successfully enter CNS tissue and release its drug cargo safely. They gain entry in two major ways: adsorption-mediated transport and receptor-mediated transport. In adsorption-mediated transport, the nanoparticle is covered in positive charges that interact with the negative charges found on the endothelium. In receptor-mediated transport, nanoparticles are covered in ligands that bind receptors found on the BBB/BSCB, so that when it encounters these receptors, endocytosis is triggered, and the nanoparticle is ferried across the endothelium. There is ongoing issue with nanoparticles as a whole, particularly regarding accumulation in the targeted region and cytotoxicity; however, nanoparticles have been found to be of incredible use to medical research and hold promise as a method of drug delivery to the CNS.

== See also ==
- Blood–brain barrier – Semipermeable capillary interface between blood and the brain
- Blood–ocular barrier – Physical barrier between the local blood vessels and most parts of the eye itself
- Blood–retinal barrier – Barrier in the eye that protects the retina
- Blood–saliva barrier – Semipermeable biological barrier
- Blood–testis barrier – Physical barrier between the blood vessels and the seminiferous tubules of animal testes
