= BTB =

BTB may refer to:

In biology:

- Blood–testis barrier in testicular anatomy
- Blood–thymus barrier
- bTB, bovine tuberculosis or Mycobacterium bovis, a disease in cattle
- Breakthrough bleeding, of the menstrual period
- Bromothymol blue, a chemical indicator for weak acids and bases
- BTB/POZ domain, a protein domain

In other uses:

- Belgian Union of Transport Workers, a trade union in Belgium
- Branch target buffer, a computer processor element
- Bétou Airport, in the Republic of the Congo (IATA airport code: BTB)
- Basil Temple Blackwood (1870–1917), British book illustrator (credited as B.T.B.)
- Bob the Builder, British children's television series
- Board-to-board connector (BTB)
