= Immunoliposome therapy =

Method of targeted drug delivery

Immunoliposome therapy is a targeted drug delivery method that involves the use of liposomes (artificial lipid bilayer vesicles) coupled with monoclonal antibodies to deliver therapeutic agents to specific sites or tissues in the body. The antibody modified liposomes target tissue through cell-specific antibodies with the release of drugs contained within the assimilated liposomes. Immunoliposome aims to improve drug stability, personalize treatments, and increased drug efficacy. This form of therapy has been used to target specific cells, protecting the encapsulated drugs from degradation in order to enhance their stability, to facilitate sustained drug release and hence to advance current traditional cancer treatment.

== History ==
Alec D. Bangham discovered liposomes in the 1960s as spherical vesicles made of a phospholipid bilayer that houses hydrophilic cores. The liposomes were then studied to uncover the properties of biological membranes and a hydration method was discovered to prepare artificial liposomes from 1968 to 1975. Since then, multiple methods of preparing liposomes have been utilized and their characteristics (physical and chemical) have been studied.

Monoclonal antibodies are proteins that stick to specific antigens that tag specific cells and can be synthesized in the lab. They were first generated in 1975 and have since advanced to being used for immunotherapy.

Immunolipsomes were developed utilizing both of these components. The first anticancer drug made with this method was doxorubicin (DOX) in the 1990s.

== Composition and structure ==
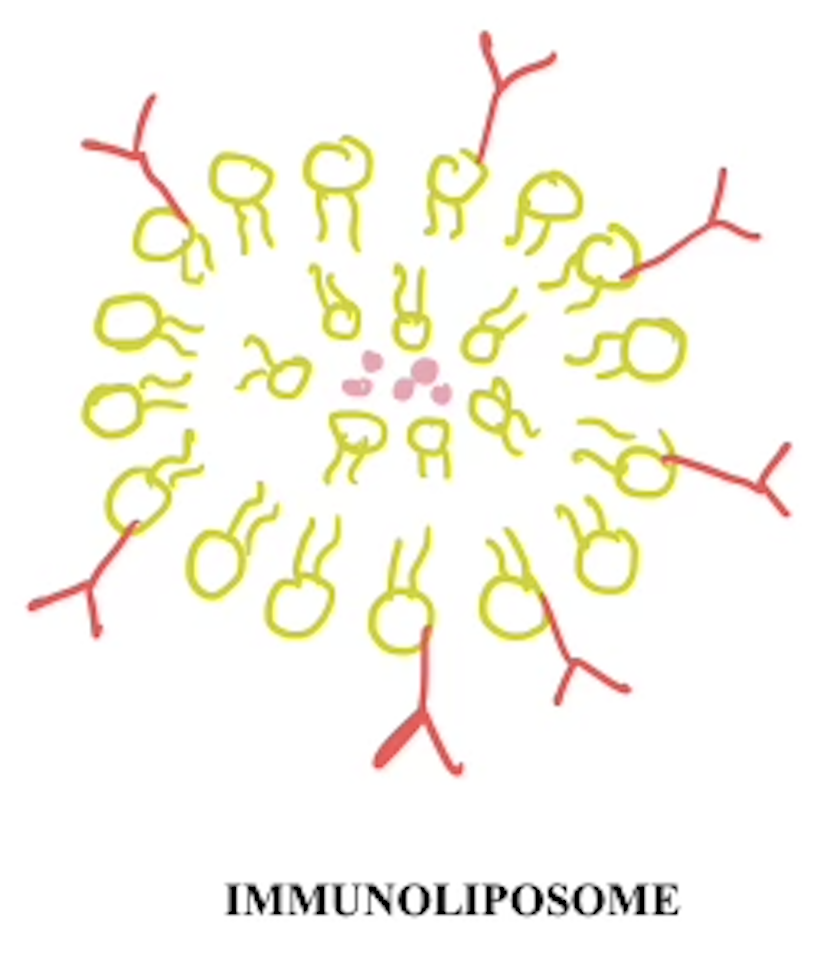
Figure 1. Schematic of a basic Immunoliposome; the antibodies (red Y-shapes) are conjugated to the phospholipids (yellow-green) that encapsulate the drug (pink dots).

The core structure of immunoliposomes is a lipid bilayer. This lipid bilayer forms a hydrophilic core, which provides stable encapsulation for a therapeutic payload. Common lipids used are phosphatidylcholine (PC), phosphatidylethanolamine (PE), and cholesterol. The lipid bilayer is surface modified through conjugation using monoclonal antibodies for specific recognition of the target cells or tissues of interest. The core of the immunoliposome contains the therapeutic payload, which can be anything from small drugs, nucleic acids, peptides, or imaging agents.

There are often stabilizers and excipients present for formulation, stability, and functionality. Some include polyethylene glycol (PEG), antioxidants to prevent degradation of lipids, and buffering agents for optimal pH.

== Synthesis ==
Immunoliposomes are created when antibodies are conjugated to liposomes. One way to do this is through covalent bonds between the antibody (or its fragment) and the lipid. Another way is through chemical modification of antibodies so they have a higher affinity for the liposome. "In general, the conjugation methodology is based on three main reactions; a reaction between activated carboxyl groups and amino groups which yields an amide bond, a reaction between pyridyl dithiols and thiols which yields disulfide bonds, and a reaction between maleimide derivatives and thiols, which yields thioether bonds."

=== Conjugation via carboxyl and amino residues ===
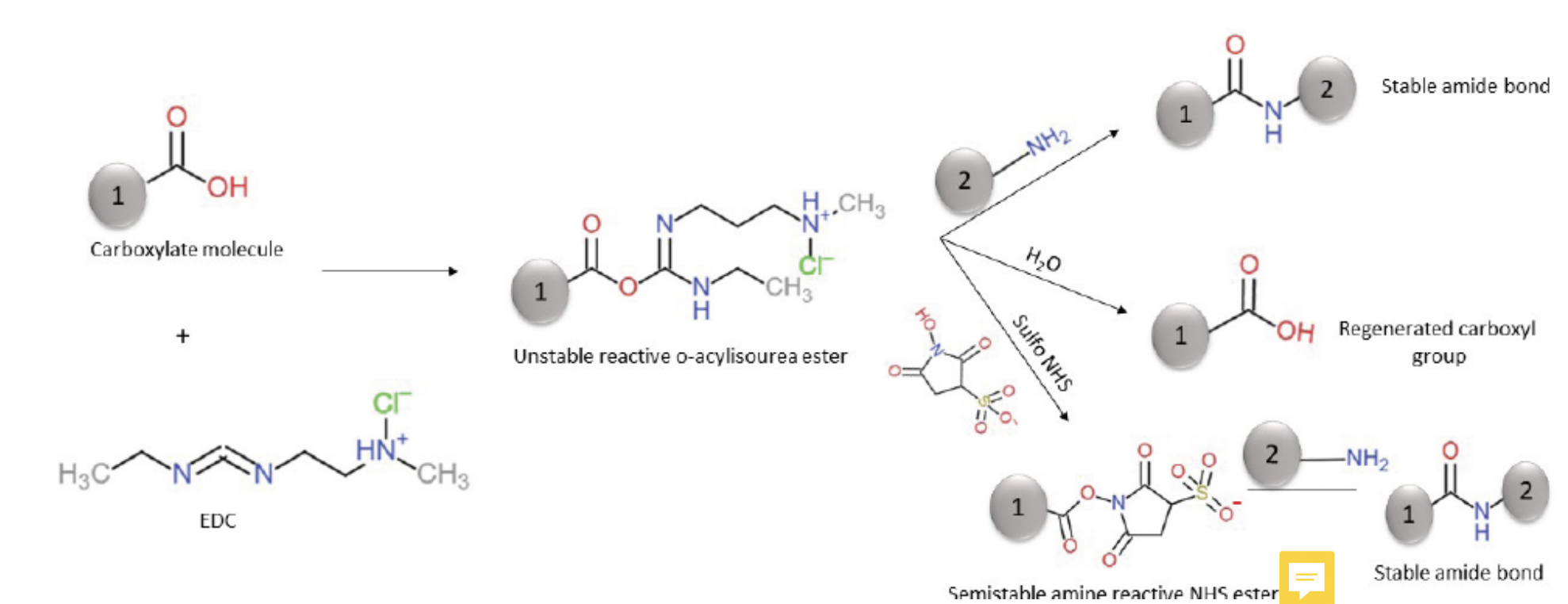
Figure 2: Process from which a carboxylate is converted into an unstable, amine reactive product using EDC to help stabilize it. This is then turned directly into amide bond, carboxyl group, or uses reagent, sulfo-NHS, to produce more amide bonds.

Amine groups are found throughout an antibody and are used as a target due to their easy steric accessibility and modification. An overview of this reaction is found in Figure 2. Most often amine groups found on lysine are covalently bonded to carboxyl groups of glutamic and aspartic acid on formed liposomes using certain agents. A two step process is utilized where the first step uses 1-ethyl-3-[3-dimethylaminopropyl] carbodiimide to create an amine reactive product from the carboxyl group. This product is a target for a nucleophilic attack by the amine but it hydrolyzes quickly, so EDC is added to stabilize it. As seen in the Figure 2, the intermediate can lead to the desired stable amide bond by chance or the recreation of a carboxyl group. To create more of the desired carboxyl-amine bond, N-hydroxysulfosuccinimide (sulfo-NHS) is added to form another intermediate that is an NHS ester. The second step to this reaction is for the antibodies to use the N-terminus of the lipid to covalently conjugate by creating an amide bond via displacement of sulfo-NHS groups. This leads to the final product of an antibody conjugated to a liposome to create an immunoliposome. This process is highly efficient and effective while maintaining the biological activity of the antibody.

=== Conjugation via thiol group ===
Another process of creating immunoliposomes is by using a thiol group and creating a thioether bond. The sulfhydryl group is a key player can is found in cysteine bridges on proteins and reagents like Traut's reagents, SATA, and Sulfo-LC-SPDP. The reduction or hydrolysis of these groups generates thiol groups that create antibody conjugation to lipids. There are multiple methods of this process, and one uses the crosslinking agent SATA as shown in Figure 3. The ester end of SATA reacts with amino groups in proteins to form an amide link and a molecule with a protected sulfhydryl group. In order to continue the reaction, this group must be freed which is done by adding hydroxylamine. The following step is to add a chemical that can be an anchor between the lipid and the thiol group. Some examples of molecules that are capable of being this anchor are maleimide, iodoacetyl groups or 2-pyridyldithiol groups. Ultimately, these steps create an antibody-enzyme conjugate that has been formulated using a thiol group.

== Mechanism of action ==
Immunoliposomes use similar functionality as liposomes with the added measure of conjugating monoclonal antibodies and their fragments to the liposomes. The use of antibodies allow for easy targeting as they can recognize many different types of antigens. Diseased cells typically contain more antigens than healthy cells, which is how antibodies are able to appropriately target certain extracellular domains (depending on antigen overexpression) and kill diseased cells. Liposomal drug delivery combined with antibodies as a targeting ligand are what help immunoliposomes function as an effective drug carrier.

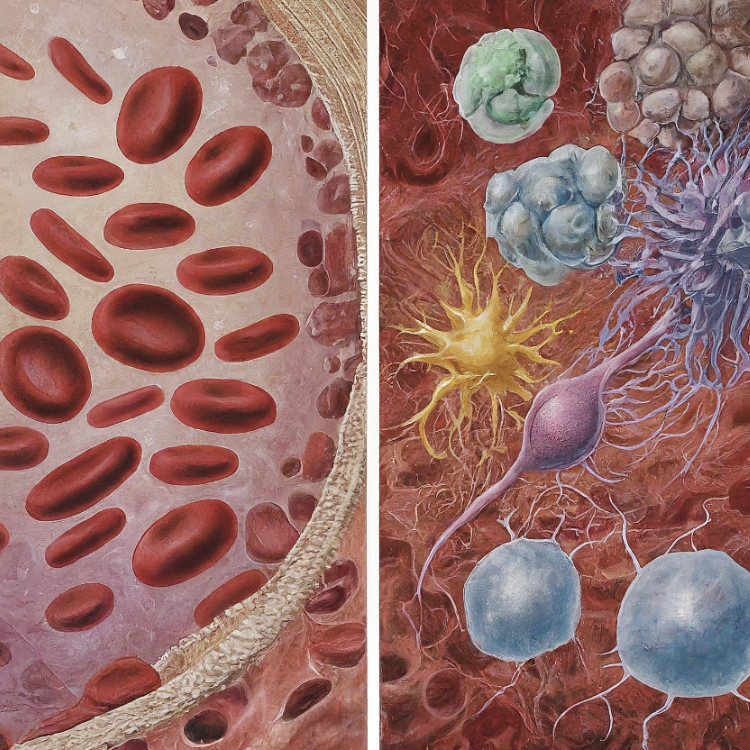
Figure 4: Intravascular cells (left side) vs. extravascular cells (right side) (AI)

Once the immunoliposomes deliver the appropriate drugs to the targeted cells, they can enter the cell using either selective uptake of liposomes by endocytosis or liposome release near the targeted cell. Because of antibody conjunction, the cellular uptake amount is increased for immunoliposomes allowing greater drug entry into diseased cells. To control when a drug is released, immunoliposomes are being developed that can sense stimuli. This stimuli can come from the microenvironment of a tumor using factors such as reduced pH, temperature, and enzyme levels. External stimuli like light, heat, magnetic fields, or ultrasound can also act as a trigger for drug release.

Immunoliposomes can target a wide variety of cell options. This can be split into two main types commonly known as intravascular and extravascular space as seen in Figure 4. Intravascular cells are more accessible during circulation and include erythrocytes, myeloid cells, lymphocytes, neutrophils, etc. Extravascular cells are located on tissue parenchymal or stromal cells. Because immunoliposomes have many antibody copies, they contain a higher avidity than just one antibody alone allowing for effective targeting against cancer cells and some drug resistant cells.

== Applications ==
Immunoliposome applications use its ability to act as a drug delivery system and release specific drug components to target cells. This mechanism can be specifically highlighted in cancer cell targeting and through nutrient delivery systems.

=== Cancer cell targeting ===
The most common use of immunoliposomes is to target cancer cells using different antibodies. Folate receptors and transferrin receptors are typically overexpressed on cancer cells, so immunoliposomes will target these corresponding ligands. Folate receptors dictate tumor cell specificity and have been seen to be expressed in multiple inflammatory diseases including psoriasis, Crohn's disease, atherosclerosis, and rheumatoid arthritis making folate-targeted immunoliposomes an efficient drug carrier to deliver antiinflammatory drugs. Transferrin receptors help with the iron demand in proliferating cancer cells and allow for formation of transferrin receptor-targeted anticancer therapies. EGFR (epidermal growth factor) is a tyrosine kinase receptor overexpressed in solid tumors such as colorectal, non small-cell lung cancer, squamous cell carcinoma, and breast cancer making it another target receptor for immunoliposomes. Some cancers create tumors that have multiple different receptors being overexpressed or utilize cancer stem cells, which allow for differentiation of numerous cancer types, so to combat this, dual-targeting immunoliposomes are being created to target multiple ligands and increase therapeutic efficacy. A study provides a promising preclinical demonstration of the effectiveness and ease of preparation of Valrubicin-loaded immunoliposomes (Val-ILs) as a novel nanoparticle technology. In the context of hematological cancers, Val-ILs have the potential to be used as a precise and effective therapy based on targeted vesicle-mediated cell death.

=== Nutrient delivery system ===
Immunoliposomes can also be used as nutrient delivery systems to help stimulate brain activity. The effective transport of certain nutrients to the hypothalamus in order to regulate brain activity is currently a huge problem. The leptin gene is used to regulate feedback loops and send signals from the adipose tissue to the hypothalamus. Using this physiological function of leptin, immunoliposome nutrient delivery systems can be integrated into the body to help with nutrition transport to the brain as seen in Figure 5. Transferrin receptors have high expression at the BBB (blood brain barrier) and can be used as targets for immunoliposomes to transport p-glycoprotein substances.

== Advantage and limitations ==
Immunoliposomes have many possible applications as described above and have certain advantages in new research and ideas. Some advantages being researched include immunoliposomes targeting specific molecules in the body. In preclinical testing, they can be environmentally responsive to specific conditions of temperature, pH, enzymes, redox reactions, magnetic energy, and light to release drugs. This conditional ability allows immunoliposomes to focus on specific target areas which can be beneficial for drug delivery. Increased targeting allows the possibility for decreased systemic toxicity while increasing drug concentration at a certain site. Even with this advantage of immunoliposomes, there are some challenges in their application.

The success of immunoliposomes during in vivo testing has been shown by multiple groups including Meeroekyai et al 2023 and animal testing has been successful in groups such as Refaat et al 2022. However, they struggle to thrive in higher level and clinical testing. This challenge stems from the variability and lack of understanding of tumors, pharmacokinetics, and large scale production of immunoliposomes. For example, tumors vary but typically have increased vascular permeability and decreased lymphatic drainage which lead to the EPR effect. EFR is the enhanced permeability and retention effect in which drug carriers depend on but the effect and environment can vary in solid tumors. This varying environment makes it hard to predict how the immunoliposome acts and quantify its pharmacokinetics. Additionally, it has been a concern that the animal models used in preclinical testing will not reflect the same effect in humans. Because of this idea, despite any preclinical success, there is a concern to test in humans due to unknown risks. For environmentally responsive immunoliposomes, more modification and purification steps are required to produce the final product. This increase in complexity for immunoliposomes and their behavior also increases costs. Another challenge to marketability and clinical research is the difficulty of scaling up the production of immunoliposomes. The procedure and use of small quantities in the laboratory make upscaling the production a challenge that has not been focused upon.

== Research ==
Liposomal medicine research for cancer therapy has increased over the years as an alternative to conventional cancer treatment. There is an interest in liposomal medicine because it features targeted drug delivery while mitigating the damage to healthy cells and tissues. One of the combination products under liposome therapy that is being researched for cancer therapy applications is immunoliposome therapy. Other research areas in liposome combination therapy include photodynamic therapy, photothermal agents, radiotherapy, and gas therapy agents.

A immunoliposome therapy clinical study that was completed was conducted by the Swiss Group for Clinical Cancer Research from 2006 to 2009. The study was a phase II clinical trial that looked at the combination of commercially sold Doxorubicin with bevacizumab, a monoclonal antibody that blocks tumor growth. The therapy was used to treat patients with locally recurrent or metastatic breast cancer. Out of the 43 patients, 16 had grade 3 palmar-plantar erythrodysesthesia, one had grade 3 mucositis, and one severe cardiotoxicity, according to the study. As a result, the combination therapy demonstrated higher than anticipated toxicity while only having modest therapeutic effect. These results concluded that, although immunoliposome therapy has promise, there is still more research needed before translating into commercial products.

== Commercialization ==
There are several liposome medicines currently available commercially, which helps set the regulatory pathway for immunoliposome therapies.

As immunoliposome therapy has progressed in research, big market players in pharmaceutical research and manufacturing have invested in the development of these therapies. A relevant example of this is a phase I/II trial that examined the effectiveness of PDS0101 in combination with pembrolizumab, an immune checkpoint inhibitor (sold under the brand name Keytruda). The study is funded by PDS Biotechnology and in partnership with Merck. The purpose of the study is to determine the effectiveness of PDS0101 + pembrolizumab in shrinking tumors in patients with virus-related oropharyngeal cancer tumors in humans. PDS0101 is a peptide-based vaccine that aids in the immune response to kill tumor cells. The study also relies on pembrolizumab monoclonal antibodies to help the body's immune system attack the cancer and interfere with the spread of tumor cells. Although immunoliposome therapy exhibits clinical and commercial promise, there are several known challenges in the translation from laboratory studies to clinical studies and ultimately to commercialization. One obstacle is that immunoliposome therapy is limited by having a short half-life and retention time once it reaches the tumor microenvironment. Additionally, immunoliposome therapies are often individualized which requires close clinical monitoring and comprehensive evaluation methods. From a biochemical perspective, other challenges that immunoliposome therapies face are drug instability due to the phospholipid bilayer and the known possibility for hepatotoxicity. From a manufacturing perspective, designing liposome drug delivery systems at an industrial scale can present a challenge due to the complexity of these drug release mechanisms and their related biosafety.

== Similar approaches ==
Though immunoliposomes serve as a possible advancement, there are other therapies similar to it that trail on the role of targeted drug delivery systems. One example of such therapy is Immune Polymeric nanoparticles, which are similar to liposomes but consist of small particles composed of biodegradable polymers. These nanoparticles similarly encapsulate drugs and can function to enhance specificity towards targeted diseased cells with peptide ligands. Another type is Targeting Antibody Drug Conjugates, which combine monoclonal antibodies with the cytotoxicity of chemotherapy drugs. This specific type is catered towards cancer cells expressing a specific target antigen. They are well-tolerated by the body as they are biodegradable, eliminating many potential toxicity factors, and proving to be a possible new model for therapeutics.
