= Blood–air barrier =

Membrane separating alveolar air from blood in lung capillaries

- Gaseous exchange in the lung

Details
- System: Respiratory system
- Location: Lungs

Identifiers
- MeSH: D015824
- TH: H3.05.02.0.00040

The blood–air barrier or air–blood barrier, (alveolar–capillary barrier or membrane) exists in the gas exchanging region of the lungs. It exists to prevent air bubbles from forming in the blood, and from blood entering the alveoli. It is formed by the type I epithelial lining cells of the alveolar wall, the endothelial cells of the capillaries and the fused basement membrane between, forming the alveolar basement membrane. The barrier is permeable to molecular oxygen, carbon dioxide, carbon monoxide and many other gases.

== Structure ==
Cross section of an alveoli with capillaries. The barrier is pointed above everything.

This blood–air barrier is extremely thin (approximately 600 nm-2μm; in some places merely 200 nm) to allow sufficient oxygen diffusion, yet it is extremely strong. This strength comes from the type IV collagen in between the endothelial and epithelial cells. Damage can occur to this barrier at a pressure difference of around 40 millimetres of mercury (0.053 bar).

== Clinical significance ==
Failure of the barrier may occur in a pulmonary barotrauma. This can be a result of several possible causes, including blast injury, swimming-induced pulmonary edema, and breathing gas entrapment or retention in the lung during depressurization, which can occur during ascent from underwater diving or loss of pressure from a pressurized vehicle, habitat or pressure suit.

Possible consequences of rupture of the blood–air barrier include arterial gas embolism and hemoptysis.

== See also ==
- Blood–brain barrier – Semipermeable capillary interface between blood and the brain
- Blood–ocular barrier – Physical barrier between the local blood vessels and most parts of the eye itself
- Blood–retinal barrier – Part of the blood–ocular barrier that prevents certain substances from entering the retina
- Blood–testis barrier – Physical barrier between the blood vessels and the seminiferous tubules of animal testes
- Blood–thymus barrier – Barrier formed by the continuous blood capillaries in the thymic cortex
- Pulmonary vein – Veins that transfer oxygenated blood from the lungs to the heart
