= Vladimir Torchilin =

Soviet-born American biochemist and pharmacologist

- Born: 1946 (age 79–80); Moscow, Soviet Union
- Education: Moscow State University (MSc 1968; PhD 1971; DSc 1981)
- Known for: Liposomes, polymeric micelles and pharmaceutical nanocarriers; drug delivery and targeting
- Awards: Lenin Prize (1982); Blaise Pascal Medal (2013); Clarivate Citation Laureate (2023)
- Scientific career
- Fields: Biochemistry; pharmacology; medical nanotechnology; drug delivery
- Workplaces: Northeastern University (1998–2026; Professor Emeritus from 2026); Harvard Medical School; Massachusetts General Hospital

Vladimir Petrovich Torchilin (Russian: Владимир Петрович Торчилин; born 1946) is a Soviet-born American biochemist, pharmacologist and expert in medical nanotechnology. He was University Distinguished Professor of Pharmaceutical Sciences and Director of the Center for Pharmaceutical Biotechnology and Nanomedicine at Northeastern University in Boston, where he served from 1998 to 2026, and has been Professor Emeritus since 2026. Before joining Northeastern he was an associate professor of radiology at Harvard Medical School.

Torchilin has published more than 650 scientific papers and reviews, written and edited 15 books and holds more than 40 patents. According to Google Scholar, his papers have received more than 105,000 citations, with an h-index of 142; these figures change over time.

In 2011 Times Higher Education ranked him second among the world's top scientists in pharmacology and toxicology for 2000–2010, a list based on publication counts and citation data. In 2021 an Elsevier/Stanford analysis ranked him as the highest-cited of more than 130,000 researchers ranked in pharmacology and pharmacy. He was named a Clarivate Citation Laureate in 2023 and an inaugural Highly Ranked Scholar by ScholarGPS in 2024. He is also a writer and a member of the Union of Moscow Writers.

== Early life and education ==
Torchilin was born in Moscow, then in the Soviet Union, in 1946. He received a Master of Science from Moscow State University in 1968, and his PhD in 1971 and DSc in 1981 from the same university. In the Soviet Union he worked at the Institute of Experimental Cardiology of the National Cardiology Research Center, on the polymeric modification of thrombolytic enzymes. In 1982 he received the Lenin Prize of the USSR in science and technology. He emigrated to the United States in 1990.

== Career ==
In 1991 Torchilin joined Massachusetts General Hospital and Harvard Medical School as head of the Chemistry Program at the Center for Imaging and Pharmaceutical Research and associate professor of radiology. From 1998 he was at Northeastern University, where he chaired the Department of Pharmaceutical Sciences (1998–2008), was Distinguished Professor of Pharmaceutical Sciences (from 2012) and directed the Center for Pharmaceutical Biotechnology and Nanomedicine (from 2005). He retired from the directorship and became Professor Emeritus in 2026.

Torchilin also led Northeastern's Center for Translational Cancer Nanomedicine, which was funded by a five-year, $13.5 million grant from the National Cancer Institute. His work helped Northeastern become the first non-Ivy League university to receive a Center for Cancer Nanotechnology Excellence grant.

== Research ==
Torchilin's research concerns liposomes, lipid-core micelles, biomedical polymers, drug delivery and targeting, pharmaceutical nanocarriers and experimental cancer therapy and immunology. His most-cited papers include a 2005 review of liposomes as pharmaceutical carriers in Nature Reviews Drug Discovery and later reviews of micellar and multifunctional nanocarriers.

== Editorial and professional service ==
Torchilin is Editor-in-Chief of Current Drug Discovery Technologies and Co-Editor-in-Chief of Current Pharmaceutical Biotechnology. He is also Editor of the Jenny Stanford Series on Biomedical Nanotechnology, Co-Editor of the Wiley series Advances in Pharmaceutical Technologies and Associate Editor of Biomedical Microdevices. He serves on the editorial boards of Bioconjugate Chemistry, Advanced Drug Delivery Reviews and other journals in drug delivery, nanomedicine and pharmaceutical sciences. He was Editor-in-Chief of Drug Delivery from 2003 to 2023 and Review Editor of the Journal of Controlled Release from 2010 to 2023. He was President of the Controlled Release Society in 2005–2006, and has mentored more than 50 PhD students.

== Awards and honours ==
- 1982 – Lenin Prize of the USSR in science and technology, for theoretical, experimental and clinical substantiation of the use of immobilized enzymes for the treatment of cardiovascular diseases
- 2002 – Fellow, American Institute for Medical and Biological Engineering
- 2002 – Member, European Academy of Science
- 2003 – Fellow, American Association of Pharmaceutical Scientists (AAPS)
- 2005 – Research Achievements in Pharmaceutics and Drug Delivery Award, AAPS
- 2007 – Research Achievements Award, Pharmaceutical Sciences World Congress
- 2009 – International Journal of Nanomedicine Distinguished Scientist Award
- 2010 – Founders Award, Controlled Release Society
- 2010 – Fellow, Controlled Release Society
- 2012 – Alec Bangham Life Achievement Award
- 2013 – Journal of Drug Targeting Life Achievement Award
- 2013 – Blaise Pascal Medal in Biomedicine, European Academy of Sciences
- 2017 – Outstanding Excellence Award, Pharmaceutica 2017, London
- 2019 – Highly Cited Researcher from Thomson Reuters
- 2023 – Citation Laureate, Clarivate
- 2024 – MRS-Serbia Award for a Lasting and Outstanding Contribution to Materials Science and Engineering (YUCOMAT 2024)
- 2024 – Inaugural Highly Ranked Scholar, ScholarGPS

== Literary work and collecting ==
Torchilin is a member of the Union of Moscow Writers. His short stories have been published in literary magazines in the USSR since the early 1980s and, after 1990, in Russian-language literary magazines in Russia and the United States. He is the author of nine books of short stories in Russian, published in Russia and the United States, and of a book of verse published in Germany in 2026. His first book in English, The Netsuke from San Francisco, was published by Austin Macauley Publishers in 2024. He is also an art and book collector, and paintings from his collections have been shown at multiple exhibitions.

== Personal life ==
Torchilin lives in Boston with his wife, Vera. They have one daughter and three grandchildren.

== Books ==
=== Scientific books ===
- Torchilin VP. Immobilized Enzymes in Medicine. Berlin–Heidelberg: Springer Verlag, 1991.
- Torchilin VP, ed. Handbook of Targeted Delivery of Imaging Agents. Boca Raton: CRC Press, 1995.
- Muzykantov VR, Torchilin VP, eds. Biomedical Aspects of Drug Targeting. Boston/Dordrecht/London: Kluwer Academic Publishers, 2002.
- Torchilin VP, Weissig V, eds. Liposomes: A Practical Approach. Oxford: Oxford University Press, 2003.
- Torchilin VP, ed. Delivery of Protein and Peptide Drugs in Cancer. London: Imperial College Press, 2006.
- Torchilin VP, ed. Nanoparticulates as Pharmaceutical Carriers. London: Imperial College Press, 2006.
- Torchilin VP, ed. Multifunctional Pharmaceutical Nanocarriers. New York: Springer, 2008.
- Torchilin VP, Amiji M, eds. Handbook of Materials for Nanomedicine. Singapore: Pan Stanford, 2011.
- Torchilin VP, ed. Handbook of Nanobiomedical Research, vols. 1–4. Singapore: World Scientific, 2014.
- Torchilin VP, ed. Smart Pharmaceutical Nanocarriers. London: Imperial College Press, 2016.
- Torchilin VP, ed. Handbook of Materials for Nanomedicine, vols. 1–3. Singapore: Jenny Stanford Publishing, 2020.
- Nayak AK, Hasnain MS, Aminabhavi TM, Torchilin VP, eds. Systems of Nanovesicular Drug Delivery. Academic Press, 2022.
- Nayak AK, Hasnain MS, Aminabhavi TM, Torchilin VP, eds. Applications of Nanovesicular Drug Delivery. Academic Press, 2022.

=== Literary works ===
- Tam, gde konchaetsia nauka. Besedy o mire i cheloveke (Moskva, Izd-vo polit. lit., 1991)
- «Странные рассказы», short stories (Москва, РИК Культура, 1995)
- «Повезло», short stories (USA, Hermitage, 1997)
- «Время между», short stories (Санкт-Петербург, Пушкинский Фонд, 2000)
- «Кружок друзей Автандила», short stories and novellas (Москва, Наука-Культура, 2006)
- «Лабух», short stories and novellas (Москва, Аграф, 2012)
- «Дом на Маросейке», short stories and novellas (Москва, Аграф, 2016)
- «Поговорим о странностях любви…», short stories and novellas (Москва, Аграф, 2018)
- «Самая главная тайна», short stories and novellas (Москва, Аграф, 2021)
- «Одна жизнь», short stories and novellas (США, M-Graphics, 2023)
- «Я помню, что будет потом», verse (Germany, 7 iskusstv, 2026)
- The Netsuke from San Francisco, short stories (New York: Austin Macauley Publishers, 2025)
