= Ethosome =

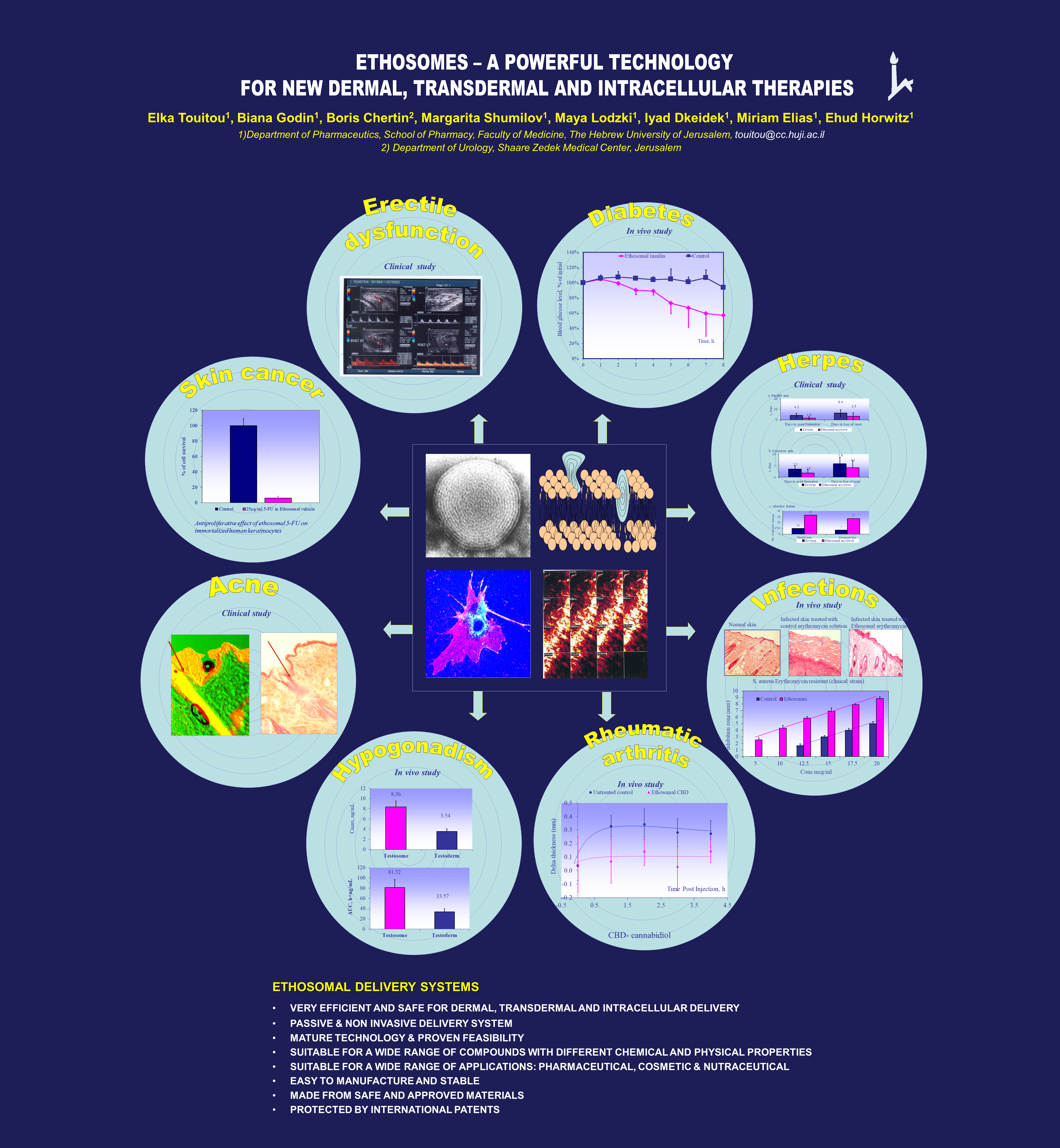
Poster on ethosomes

Ethosomes are phospholipid nanovesicles used for dermal and transdermal delivery of molecules. Ethosomes were developed by Touitou et al.,1997, as additional novel lipid carriers composed of ethanol, phospholipids, and water. They are reported to improve the skin delivery of various drugs. Ethanol is an efficient permeation enhancer that is believed to act by affecting the intercellular region of the stratum corneum. Ethosomes are soft malleable vesicles composed mainly of phospholipids, ethanol (relatively high concentration), and water. These soft vesicles represent novel vesicles carriers for enhanced delivery through the skin. The size of the ethosomes vesicles can be modulated from tens of nanometers to microns.

== Structure and composition ==
Ethosomes are mainly composed of multiple, concentric layers of flexible phospholipid bilayers, with a relative high concentration of ethanol (20-45%), glycols and water. Their overall structure has been confirmed by ^{31}P-NMR, EM and DSC. They have high penetration of the horny layer of the skin, which enhances the permeation of encapsulated drugs. The mechanism of permeation enhancement is attributed to the overall properties of the system.

== Applications ==
Because of their unique structure, ethosomes are able to efficiently encapsulate and deliver into the skin highly lipophilic molecules such as testosterone, cannabinoids and ibuprofen, as well as hydrophilic drugs such as clindamycin phosphate, buspirone hydrochloride. They have been studied for the transdermal and intradermal delivery of peptides, steroids, antibiotics, prostaglandins, antivirals and anti-pyretics. The components used to make ethosomes are already approved for pharmaceutical and cosmetic use and the formulated vesicles are stable when stored. They can be incorporated in various pharmaceutical formulations such as gels, creams, emulsions and sprays. They're consequently being developed for pharmaceutical and cosmeceutical products. Ethosomal systems compare favourably to alternative carriers for quantity and depth of molecule delivery.
