= Blood–saliva barrier =

Semipermeable biological barrier

The blood–saliva barrier (BSB) is a biological barrier that consists of the epithelial cell layers of the oral mucosa and salivary glands, and provides physiological separation between blood vessels and the saliva in the oral cavity. In Russian academic literature the barrier is usually called the hematosalivary or hematosalivarian barrier.

== Structure ==
The blood–saliva barrier is primarily formed by the endothelial cells lining the blood vessels and the epithelial cells lining the oral mucosa, and also has a connective tissue layer. The epithelial cells of the blood–saliva barrier present in gingival epithelium (lining the gums) and junctional epithelium (that surrounds teeth at their base where they emerge from gums).

== Function ==
The blood–saliva barrier is a protective mechanism that helps maintain the integrity and stability of the blood and prevents the exchange of certain substances between the bloodstream and saliva, such as electrolytes, small-molecular-weight proteins, metabolic products, and specific/non-specific defense factors.The blood–saliva barrier also plays a role in immune defense mechanisms within the oral cavity. Immune cells, such as macrophages and lymphocytes, are contained within the connective tissue layer beneath the barrier.

Salivary glands are well-perfused organs due to the presence of numerous arterio-venous anastomoses with sphincters. When these sphincters close, they increase the pressure in the capillaries of salivary glands, facilitating the movement of various metabolites from the capillary lumen into secretory epithelial cells for saliva formation. Salivary glands exhibit high selectivity in their activity, confirming the functioning of the barrier which regulates its permeability in response to physiological or pathological changes within the body. Substance entry through the barrier mainly occurs via simple passive diffusion (paracellular), active transport, or endocytosis, primarily determined by lipophilicity, charge, and size of substances being transported. Proteinaceous substances are thought to be primarily transported across the mucosa via a paracellular mechanism facilitated by passive diffusion.

The blood–saliva barrier changes permeability under the influence of the autonomic nervous system and hormonal factors.

== Clinical significance ==
In vitro models of the blood–saliva barrier are used to investigate and understand the transport of salivary biomarkers from blood to saliva.

The ability of blood–saliva barrier of preventing the transport of certain molecules from blood to saliva while allowing the transport of the other has a practical application in measuring levels of steroids which are unbound ("free") and have biological activity. An example of such molecule is cortisol, which is lipophilic, and is transported bound to transcortin (also known as corticosteroid-binding globulin) and albumin, while only a small part of the total serum cortisol is unbound and has biological activity. This binding of cortisol to transcortin is accomplished through hydrophobic interactions in which cortisol binds in a 1:1 ratio. Serum cortisol assays measure total cortisol, and such results may be misleading for patients with altered serum protein concentrations. The salivary cortisol test avoids this problem because only free cortisol can pass through blood–saliva barrier due to the fact that transcortin particles are too large to pass through the barrier.

== History ==
A key milestone in the study of the blood–saliva barrier in medicine was reached when Soviet physiologist Lina Stern introduced the concept of "histohematological barriers" in 1929, highlighting their plasticity and their ability to regulate internal environment homeostasis through interactions with exogenous and endogenous physiological compounds. While working at the University of Geneva, Stern published a series of studies demonstrating the existence of the blood–brain barrier with colleague Raymond Gautier. In a 1934 paper, Stern also introduced the notions of barrier selectivity and barrier resistance, realizing that the blood–brain barrier both selectively allows certain substances to enter the brain and protects the internal milieu of the brain from that of the blood. The study of the blood–brain barrier contributed to the subsequent studies of the other anatomical barriers. A significant place in understanding of the barrier mechanisms is occupied by the placental barrier, which exists between maternal blood and fetal tissues. Following extended research, the blood–saliva barrier was described for the first time in 1977 by a Soviet physician Yurii Alexandrovich Petrovich as "hematosalivary barrier".

== Research directions ==
In recent years, significant progress has been made in studying different aspects blood–saliva barrier function using advanced tools such as molecular biology techniques, confocal microscopy, immunofluorescence staining methods, and transcellular migration assays. These studies explain cellular interactions involved in creating tight junctions between endothelial cells lining capillaries within salivary glands.Furthermore, experimental models utilizing cell cultures have demonstrated potential applications for tissue engineering approaches aimed at developing artificial salivary glands or improving treatments for conditions associated with reduced salivation.

== See also ==
- Blood–brain barrier – Semipermeable capillary interface between blood and the brain
- Blood–ocular barrier – Physical barrier between the local blood vessels and most parts of the eye itself
- Blood–retinal barrier – Barrier in the eye that protects the retina
- Blood–spinal cord barrier – Semipermeable anatomical interface
- Blood–testis barrier – Physical barrier between the blood vessels and the seminiferous tubules of animal testes
