= Blood–thymus barrier =

Barrier formed by the continuous blood capillaries in the thymic cortex

The blood–thymus barrier regulates exchange of substances between the circulatory system and thymus, providing a sequestered environment for immature T cells to develop. The barrier also prevents the immature T cells from contacting foreign antigens (since contact with antigens at this stage will cause the T cells to die by apoptosis).

The barrier is formed by the continuous blood capillaries in the thymic cortex, reinforced by type 1 epithelial reticular cells (sometimes called thymic epithelial cells) and macrophages.

The existence of this barrier was first proposed in 1961 and demonstrated to exist in mice in 1963.

== See also ==
- Blood–air barrier – Membrane separating alveolar air from blood in lung capillaries
- Blood–brain barrier – Semipermeable capillary border that allows selective passage of blood constituents into the brain
- Blood–ocular barrier – Physical barrier between the local blood vessels and most parts of the eye itself
- Blood–retinal barrier – Part of the blood–ocular barrier that prevents certain substances from entering the retina
- Blood–testis barrier – Physical barrier between the blood vessels and the seminiferous tubules of animal testes
