= Blood–retinal barrier =

Barrier in the eye that protects the retina

The blood–retinal barrier, or the BRB, is part of the blood–ocular barrier that consists of cells that are joined tightly together to prevent certain substances from entering the tissue of the retina. It consists of non-fenestrated capillaries of the retinal circulation and tight-junctions between retinal epithelial cells preventing passage of large molecules from choriocapillaris into the retina.

== Structure ==
The blood retinal barrier has two components: the retinal vascular endothelium and the retinal pigment epithelium. Retinal blood vessels that are similar to cerebral blood vessels maintain the inner blood-ocular barrier. This physiological barrier comprises a single layer of non-fenestrated endothelial cells, which have tight junctions. These junctions are impervious to tracer, so many substances can affect the metabolism of the eyeball. The retinal pigment epithelium maintains the outer blood–retinal barrier.

== Clinical significance ==
=== Diabetic retinopathy ===
Diabetic retinopathy, eye damage that frequently occurs as a result of diabetes, is related to the breakdown of the blood–retinal barrier. The barrier becomes more leaky in patients with diabetic retinopathy.

== Other animals ==
Animal models have shown that the blood–retinal barrier becomes more permeable to substances in hypertensive animals (those with high blood pressure).

== See also ==
- Blood–air barrier – Membrane separating alveolar air from blood in lung capillaries
- Blood–brain barrier – Semipermeable capillary interface between blood and the brain
- Blood–ocular barrier – Physical barrier between the local blood vessels and most parts of the eye itself
- Blood–saliva barrier – Semipermeable biological barrier
- Blood–testis barrier – Physical barrier between the blood vessels and the seminiferous tubules of animal testes
- Blood–thymus barrier – Barrier formed by the continuous blood capillaries in the thymic cortex
