= Blood–ocular barrier =

Physical barrier between the local blood vessels and most parts of the eye itself

The blood–ocular barrier is a barrier created by endothelium of capillaries of the retina and iris, ciliary epithelium and retinal pigment epithelium. It is a physical barrier between the local blood vessels and most parts of the eye itself, and stops many substances including drugs from traveling across it. Inflammation can break down this barrier allowing drugs and large molecules to penetrate into the eye. As the inflammation subsides, this barrier usually returns.

It consists of the following components:

- Blood–aqueous barrier: the ciliary epithelium and capillaries of the iris. Blood-aqueous barrier is formed by nonpigmented ciliary epithelial cells of the ciliary body and endothelial cells of blood vessels in the iris.
- Blood–retinal barrier: non-fenestrated capillaries of the retinal circulation and tight-junctions between retinal epithelial cells preventing passage of large molecules from choriocapillaries into the retina. Formed by endothelium of retinal vessels and epithelium of retinal pigment.

== See also ==
- Blood–air barrier – Membrane separating alveolar air from blood in lung capillaries
- Blood–brain barrier – Semipermeable capillary interface between blood and the brain
- Blood–retinal barrier – Barrier in the eye that protects the retina
- Blood–saliva barrier – Semipermeable biological barrier
- Blood–testis barrier – Physical barrier between the blood vessels and the seminiferous tubules of animal testes
- Blood–thymus barrier – Barrier formed by the continuous blood capillaries in the thymic cortex
