= Liposome =

Composite structure formed by phospholipids

Scheme of a liposome formed by phospholipids in an aqueous solution.

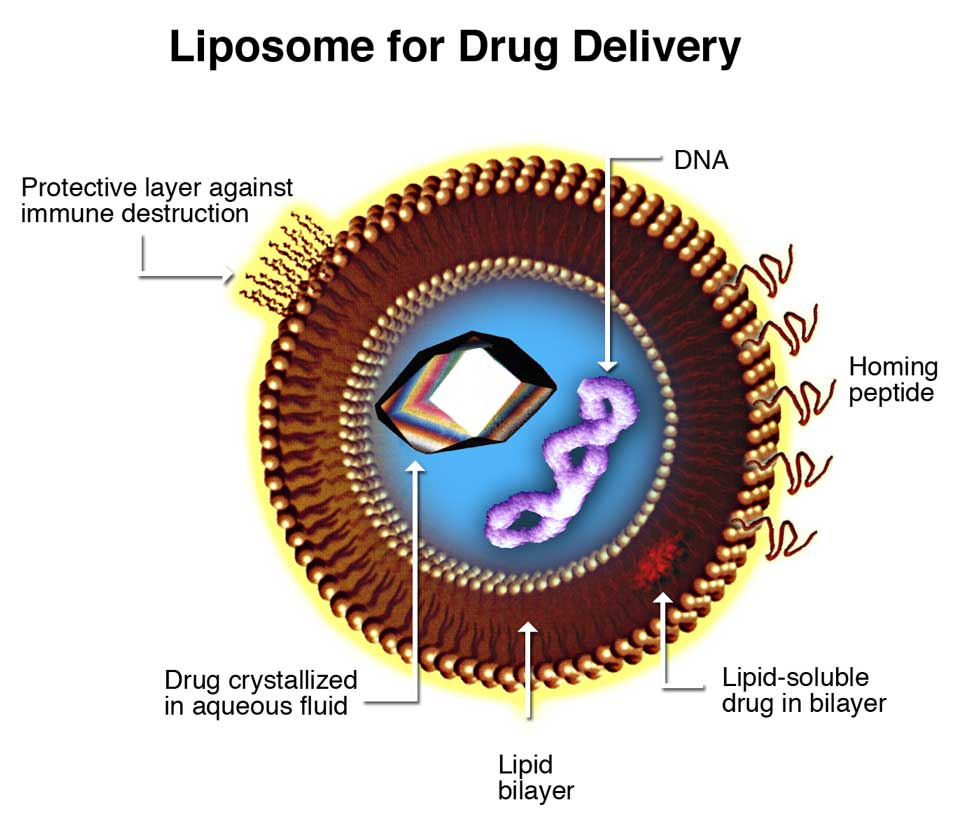
Liposomes are composite structures made of phospholipids and may contain small amounts of other molecules. Though liposomes can vary in size from low micrometer range to tens of micrometers, unilamellar liposomes, as pictured here, are typically in the lower size range with various targeting ligands attached to their surface allowing for their surface-attachment and accumulation in pathological areas for treatment of disease.

A liposome is a small artificial vesicle, spherical in shape, having at least one lipid bilayer. Due to their hydrophobicity and/or hydrophilicity, biocompatibility, particle size and many other properties, liposomes can be used as drug delivery vehicles for administration of pharmaceutical drugs and nutrients, such as lipid nanoparticles in mRNA vaccines, and DNA vaccines. Liposomes can be prepared by disrupting biological membranes (such as by sonication). A nanoliposome or nanoliposomal vehicle is a liposome in the nanoscale; in other words, it is a kind of nanocarrier involved in the processes of nanoencapsulation and nanodelivery. Another kind of lipid-based nanocarrier similar to the nanoliposome is the nanocochleate; however, whilst nanoliposomes have a roughly spherical shape, a nanocochleate has a cylindrical (cigar-like) microstructure created by spirally rolled bilayers in which drugs (e.g., hydrophobic and hydrophilic biomolecules) are nanoincapsulated.

Liposomes are most often composed of phospholipids, especially phosphatidylcholine, and cholesterol, but may also include other lipids, such as those found in egg and phosphatidylethanolamine, as long as they are compatible with lipid bilayer structure. A liposome design may employ surface ligands for attaching to desired cells or tissues.

Based on vesicle structure, there are seven main categories for liposomes: multilamellar large (MLV), oligolamellar (OLV), small unilamellar (SUV), medium-sized unilamellar (MUV), large unilamellar (LUV), giant unilamellar (GUV) and multivesicular vesicles (MVV). The major types of liposomes are the multilamellar vesicle (MLV, with several lamellar phase lipid bilayers), the small unilamellar liposome vesicle (SUV, with one lipid bilayer), the large unilamellar vesicle (LUV), and the cochleate vesicle. A less desirable form is multivesicular liposomes in which one vesicle contains one or more smaller vesicles.

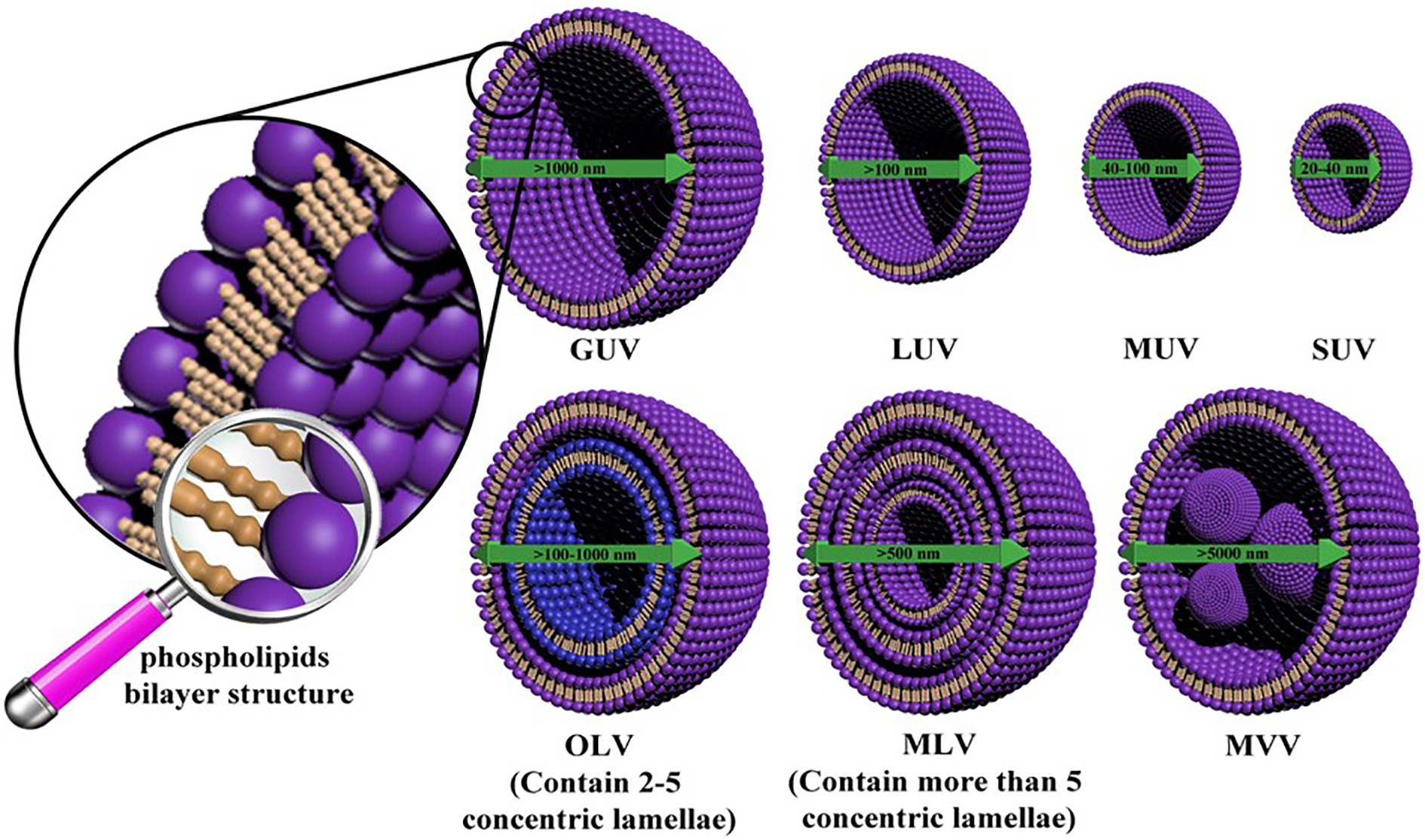
Seven main categories for liposomes: multilamellar large (MLV), oligolamellar (OLV), small unilamellar (SUV), medium-sized unilamellar (MUV), large unilamellar (LUV), giant unilamellar (GUV) and multivesicular vesicles (MVV)).

Liposomes should not be confused with lysosomes, or with micelles and reverse micelles. In contrast to liposomes, micelles typically contain a monolayer of fatty acids or surfactants.

== Discovery ==
The word liposome derives from two Greek words: lipo ("fat") and soma ("body"); it is so named because its composition is primarily of phospholipid.

Liposomes were first described by British hematologist Alec Douglas Bangham in 1961 at the Babraham Institute, in Cambridge—findings that were published 1964. The discovery came about when Bangham and R. W. Horne were testing the institute's new electron microscope by adding negative stain to dry phospholipids. The resemblance to the plasmalemma was obvious, and the microscopic pictures provided the first evidence that the cell membrane is a bilayer lipid structure. The following year, Bangham, his colleague Malcolm Standish, and Gerald Weissmann, an American physician, established the integrity of this closed, bilayer structure and its ability to release its contents following detergent treatment (structure-linked latency). During a Cambridge pub discussion with Bangham, Weissmann first named the structures "liposomes" after something which laboratory had been studying, the lysosome: a simple organelle whose structure-linked latency could be disrupted by detergents and streptolysins. Liposomes are readily distinguishable from micelles and hexagonal lipid phases through negative staining transmission electron microscopy.

Bangham, with colleagues Jeff Watkins and Standish, wrote the 1965 paper that effectively launched what would become the liposome "industry." Around that same time, Weissmann joined Bangham at the Babraham. Later, Weissmann, then an emeritus professor at New York University School of Medicine, recalled the two of them sitting in a Cambridge pub, reflecting on the role of lipid sheets in separating the cell interior from its exterior milieu. This insight, they felt, would be to cell function what the discovery of the double helix had been to genetics. As Bangham had been calling his lipid structures "multilamellar smectic mesophases," or sometimes "Banghasomes," Weissmann proposed the more user-friendly term liposome.

== Mechanism ==
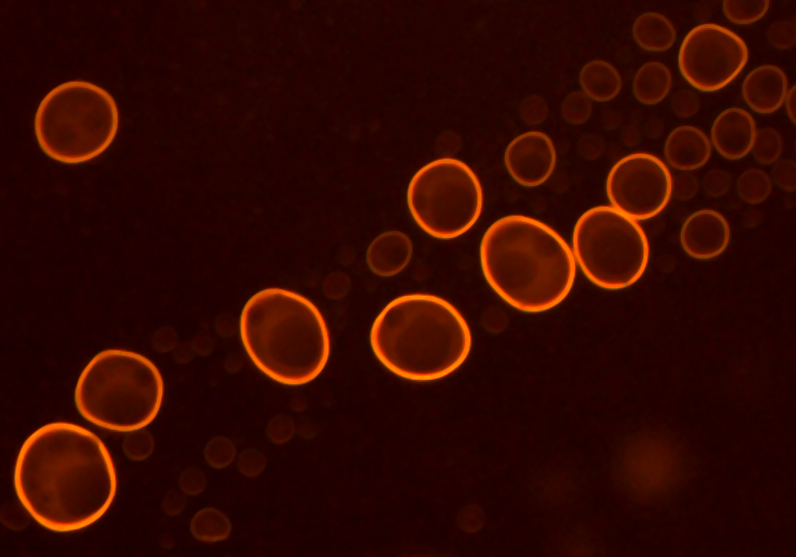
A micrograph of phosphatidylcholine liposomes, which were stained with fluorochrome acridine orange. Method of fluorescence microscopy (1250-fold magnification).

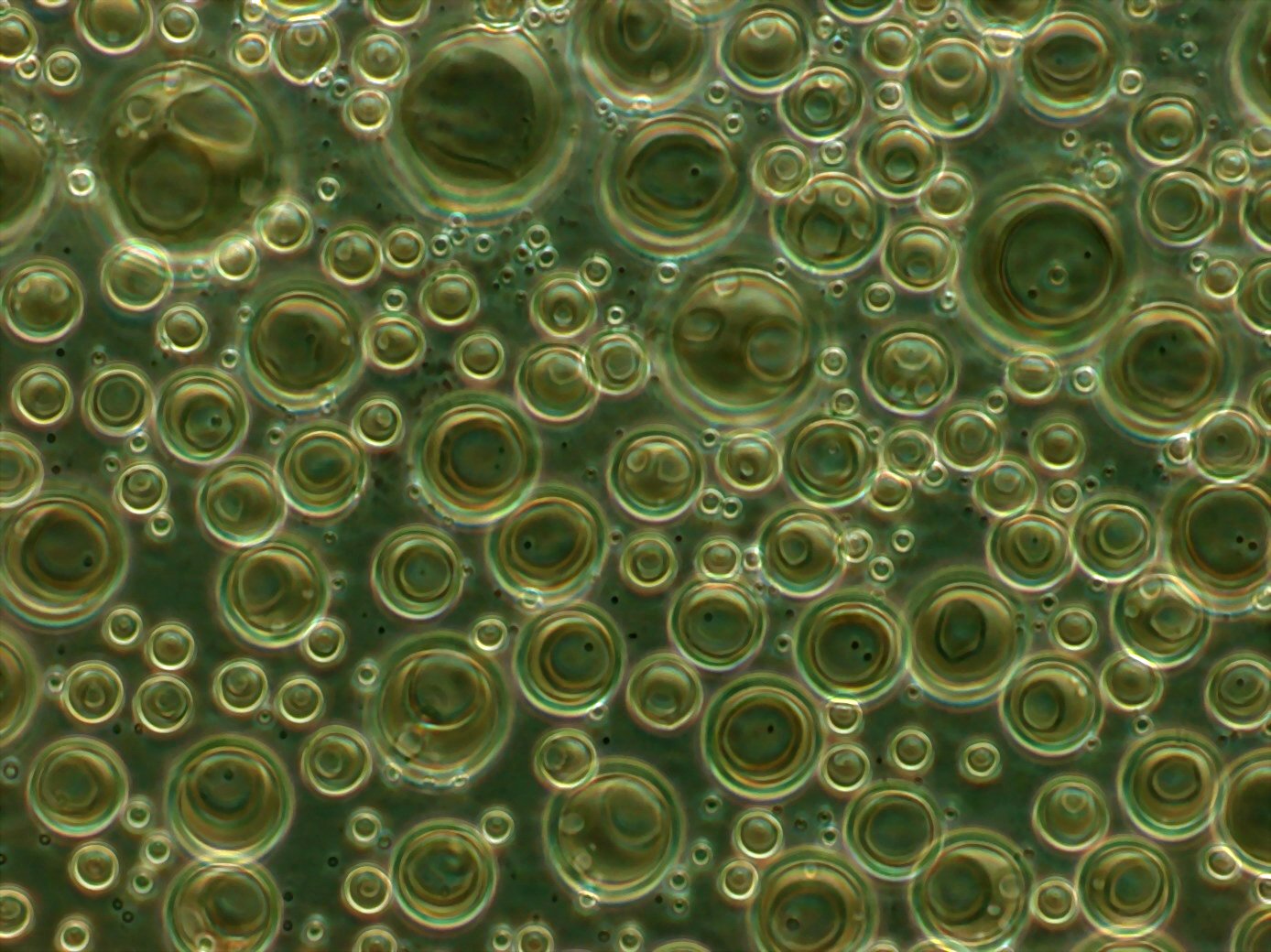
Various types of phosphatidylcholine liposomes in suspension. Method of phase-contrast microscopy (1000-fold magnification). The following types of liposomes are visible: small monolamellar vesicles, large monolamellar vesicles, multilamellar vesicles, oligolamellar vesicles.

=== Encapsulation in liposomes ===
A liposome has an aqueous solution core surrounded by a hydrophobic membrane, in the form of a lipid bilayer; hydrophilic solutes dissolved in the core cannot readily pass through the bilayer. Hydrophobic chemicals associate with the bilayer. This property can be utilized to load liposomes with hydrophobic and/or hydrophilic molecules, a process known as encapsulation. Typically, liposomes are prepared in a solution containing the compound to be trapped, which can either be an aqueous solution for encapsulating hydrophilic compounds like proteins, or solutions in organic solvents mixed with lipids for encapsulating hydrophobic molecules. Encapsulation techniques can be categorized into two types: passive, which relies on the stochastic trapping of molecules during liposome formation, and active, which relies on the presence of charged lipids or transmembrane ion gradients. A crucial parameter to consider is the "encapsulation efficiency," which is defined as the amount of compound present in the liposome solution divided by the total initial amount of compound used during the preparation. In more recent developments, the application of liposomes in single-molecule experiments has introduced the concept of "single entity encapsulation efficiency." This term refers to the probability of a specific liposome containing the required number of copies of the compound.

=== Delivery ===
To deliver the molecules to a site of action, the lipid bilayer can fuse with other bilayers such as the cell membrane, thus delivering the liposome contents; this is a complex and non-spontaneous event, however, that does not apply to nutrients and drug delivery. By preparing liposomes in a solution of DNA or drugs (which would normally be unable to diffuse through the membrane) they can be (indiscriminately) delivered past the lipid bilayer. Liposomes can also be designed to deliver drugs in other ways. Liposomes that contain low (or high) pH can be constructed such that dissolved aqueous drugs will be charged in solution (i.e., the pH is outside the drug's pI range). As the pH naturally neutralizes within the liposome (protons can pass through some membranes), the drug will also be neutralized, allowing it to freely pass through a membrane. These liposomes work to deliver drug by diffusion rather than by direct cell fusion. However, the efficacy of this pH regulated passage depends on the physiochemical nature of the drug in question (e.g. pKa and having a basic or acid nature), which is very low for many drugs.

A similar approach can be exploited in the biodetoxification of drugs by injecting empty liposomes with a transmembrane pH gradient. In this case the vesicles act as sinks to scavenge the drug in the blood circulation and prevent its toxic effect. Another strategy for liposome drug delivery is to target endocytosis events. Liposomes can be made in a particular size range that makes them viable targets for natural macrophage phagocytosis. These liposomes may be digested while in the macrophage's phagosome, thus releasing its drug. Liposomes can also be decorated with opsonins and ligands to activate endocytosis in other cell types.

To improve the tolerability of amphotericin and reduce toxicity, researchers developed several lipid formulations. Liposomal formulations have been found to have less renal toxicity than deoxycholate. and fewer infusion-related reactions.

AmBisome (liposomal amphotericin B; LAMB) is a liposomal formulation of amphotericin B for injection and consists of a mixture of phosphatidylcholine, cholesterol and distearoyl phosphatidylglycerol that in aqueous media spontaneously arrange into unilamellar vesicles that contain amphotericin B. It was developed by NeXstar Pharmaceuticals (acquired by Gilead Sciences in 1999). It was approved by the FDA in 1997. It is marketed by Gilead in Europe and licensed to Astellas Pharma (formerly Fujisawa Pharmaceuticals) for marketing in the US, and Sumitomo Pharmaceuticals in Japan.^{[56][57][58]}

Regarding pH-sensitive liposomes, there are three mechanisms of drug delivery intracellularly, which occurs via endocytosis. This is possible because of the acidic environment within endosomes. The first mechanism is through the destabilization of the liposome within the endosome, triggering pore formation on the endosomal membrane and allowing diffusion of the liposome and its contents into the cytoplasm. Another is the release of the encapsulated content within the endosome, eventually diffusing out into the cytoplasm through the endosomal membrane. Lastly, the membrane of the liposome and the endosome fuse together, releasing the encapsulated contents onto the cytoplasm and avoiding degradation at the lysosomal level due to minimal contact time.

Certain anticancer drugs such as doxorubicin (Doxil) and daunorubicin may be administered encapsulated in liposomes. Liposomal cisplatin has received orphan drug designation for pancreatic cancer from EMEA. A study provides a promising preclinical demonstration of the effectiveness and ease of preparation of valrubicin-loaded immunoliposomes (Val-ILs) as a novel nanoparticle technology. In the context of hematological cancers, Val-ILs have the potential to be used as a precise and effective therapy based on targeted vesicle-mediated cell death.

The use of liposomes for transformation or transfection of DNA into a host cell is known as lipofection.

In addition to gene and drug delivery applications, liposomes can be used as carriers for the delivery of dyes to textiles, pesticides to plants, enzymes and nutritional supplements to foods, and cosmetics to the skin.

Liposomes are also used as outer shells of some microbubble contrast agents used in contrast-enhanced ultrasound.

== Dietary and nutritional supplements ==
Until recently, the clinical uses of liposomes were for targeted drug delivery, but new applications for the oral delivery of certain dietary and nutritional supplements are in development. This new application of liposomes is in part due to the low absorption and bioavailability rates of traditional oral dietary and nutritional tablets and capsules. The low oral bioavailability and absorption of many nutrients is clinically well documented. Therefore, the natural encapsulation of lypophilic and hydrophilic nutrients within liposomes would be an effective method of bypassing the destructive elements of the gastric system and small intestines allowing the encapsulated nutrient to be efficiently delivered to the cells and tissues.

The term nutraceutical combines the words nutrient and pharmaceutical, originally coined by Stephen DeFelice, who defined nutraceuticals as "food or part of a food that provides medical or health benefits, including the prevention and/or treatment of a disease". However, currently, there is no conclusive definition of nutraceuticals yet, to distinguish them from other food‐derived categories, such as food (dietary) supplements, herbal products, pre‐ and probiotics, functional foods, and fortified foods. Generally, this term is used to describe any product derived from food sources which is expected to provide health benefits additionally to the nutritional value of daily food. A wide range of nutrients or other substances with nutritional or physiological effects (EU Directive 2002/46/EC) might be present in these products, including vitamins, minerals, amino acids, essential fatty acids, fibres and various plants and herbal extracts. Liposomal nutraceuticals contain bioactive compounds with health-promoting effects. The encapsulation of bioactive compounds in liposomes is attractive as liposomes have been shown to be able to overcome serious hurdles bioactives would otherwise encounter in the gastrointestinal (GI) tract upon oral intake.

Certain factors have far-reaching effects on the percentage of liposome that are yielded in manufacturing, as well as the actual amount of realized liposome entrapment and the actual quality and long-term stability of the liposomes themselves. They are the following: (1) The actual manufacturing method and preparation of the liposomes themselves; (2) The constitution, quality, and type of raw phospholipid used in the formulation and manufacturing of the liposomes; (3) The ability to create homogeneous liposome particle sizes that are stable and hold their encapsulated payload. These are the primary elements in developing effective liposome carriers for use in dietary and nutritional supplements.

Liposomes have also been studied in food science and technology as encapsulation systems for dietary nutrients, nutraceuticals, antimicrobials, probiotics, enzymes, proteins, essential oils, fatty acids, natural colours, flavours and other food additives. In this context, liposomal encapsulation is investigated to improve stability, protection during processing or storage, and controlled delivery of bioactive food ingredients.

== Manufacturing ==
The choice of liposome preparation method depends, i.a., on the following parameters:

1. the physicochemical characteristics of the material to be entrapped and those of the liposomal ingredients;
2. the nature of the medium in which the lipid vesicles are dispersed
3. the effective concentration of the entrapped substance and its potential toxicity;
4. additional processes involved during application/delivery of the vesicles;
5. optimum size, polydispersity and shelf-life of the vesicles for the intended application; and,
6. batch-to-batch reproducibility and possibility of large-scale production of safe and efficient liposomal products

Useful liposomes rarely form spontaneously. They typically form after supplying enough energy to a dispersion of (phospho)lipids in a polar solvent, such as water, to break down multilamellar aggregates into oligo- or unilamellar bilayer vesicles.

Liposomes can hence be created by sonicating a dispersion of amphipathic lipids, such as phospholipids, in water. Low shear rates create multilamellar liposomes. The original aggregates, which have many layers like an onion, thereby form progressively smaller and finally unilamellar liposomes (which are often unstable, owing to their small size and the sonication-created defects). Sonication is generally considered a "gross" method of preparation as it can damage the structure of the drug to be encapsulated. Newer methods such as extrusion, micromixing and Mozafari method are employed to produce materials for human use. Using lipids other than phosphatidylcholine can greatly facilitate liposome preparation. In addition to sonication and extrusion, liposomes can be prepared by controlled-mixing methods, including ethanol injection, microfluidic mixing and other micromixing approaches. Microfluidic and other continuous-flow mixing methods have become widely used approaches for liposome and lipid-nanoparticle preparation, because they allow controlled mixing, continuous production and improved reproducibility of vesicle size and size distribution. However, lipid composition, solvent phase, lipid concentration, flow-rate ratio, total flow rate and post-processing conditions can strongly affect the final vesicle population.

== Prospect ==
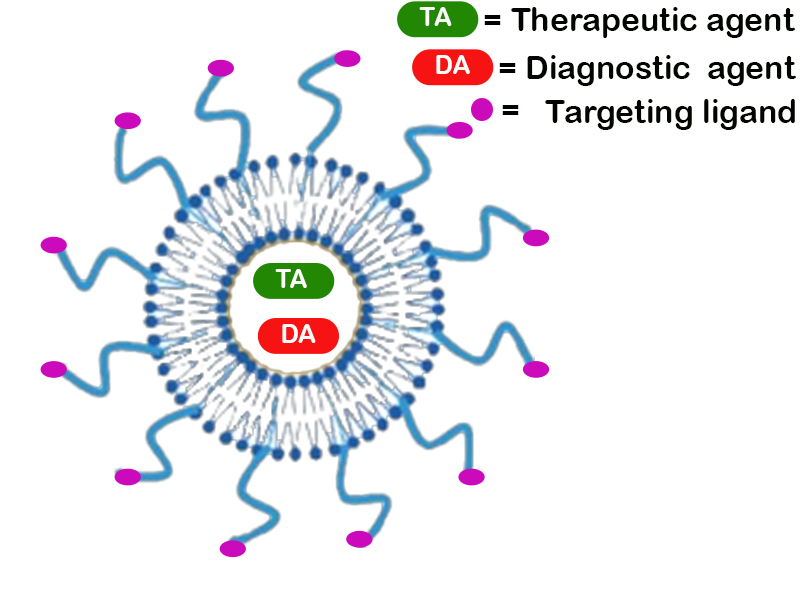
Pictorial representation of targeted theranostics liposomal delivery

Further advances in liposome research have been able to allow liposomes to avoid detection by the body's immune system, specifically, the cells of reticuloendothelial system (RES). These liposomes are known as "stealth liposomes". They were first proposed by G. Cevc and G. Blume and, independently and soon thereafter, the groups of L. Huang and Vladimir Torchilin and are constructed with PEG (Polyethylene Glycol) studding the outside of the membrane. The PEG coating, which is inert in the body, allows for longer circulatory life for the drug delivery mechanism. Studies have also shown that PEGylated liposomes elicit anti-IgM antibodies, thus leading to an enhanced blood clearance of the liposomes upon re-injection, depending on lipid dose and time interval between injections. In addition to a PEG coating, some stealth liposomes also have some sort of biological species attached as a ligand to the liposome, to enable binding via a specific expression on the targeted drug delivery site. These targeting ligands could be monoclonal antibodies (making an immunoliposome), vitamins, or specific antigens, but must be accessible. Targeted liposomes can target certain cell type in the body and deliver drugs that would otherwise be systemically delivered. Naturally toxic drugs can be much less systemically toxic if delivered only to diseased tissues. Polymersomes, morphologically related to liposomes, can also be used this way. Also morphologically related to liposomes are highly deformable vesicles, designed for non-invasive transdermal material delivery, known as transfersomes.

Liposomes are used as models for artificial cells.

Liposomes can be used on their own or in combination with traditional antibiotics as neutralizing agents of bacterial toxins. Many bacterial toxins evolved to target specific lipids of the host cells membrane and can be baited and neutralized by liposomes containing those specific lipid targets.

A study published in May 2018 also explored the potential use of liposomes as "nano-carriers" of fertilizing nutrients to treat malnourished or sickly plants. Results showed that these synthetic particles "soak into plant leaves more easily than naked nutrients", further validating the utilization of nanotechnology to increase crop yields.

Machine learning has started to contribute to liposome research. For example, deep learning was used to monitor a multistep bioassay containing sucrose-loaded and nucleotides-loaded liposomes interacting with a lipid membrane-perforating peptide. Artificial neural networks were also used to optimize formulation parameters of leuprolide acetate loaded liposomes and to predict the particle size and the polydispersity index of liposomes.

== See also ==
- Azotosome
- Drug vectorization
- Lamella (cell biology)
- Langmuir–Blodgett film
- Lipid bilayer
- Nanomedicine
- Targeted drug delivery
- Vesicle (biology and chemistry)
