= Blood–brain barrier =

Semipermeable capillary interface between blood and the brain

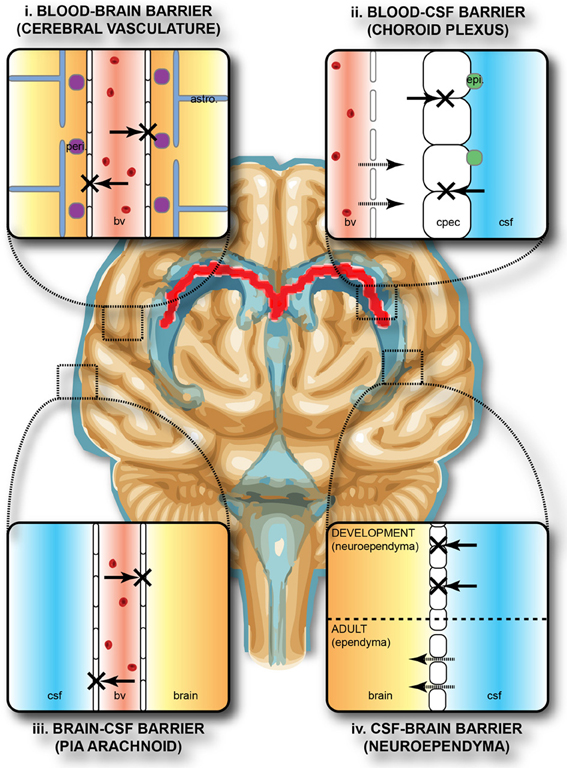
- Solute permeability at the BBB vs. choroid plexus

Details
- System: cerebral circulation

Identifiers
- Acronym: BBB
- MeSH: D001812

The blood–brain barrier (BBB) is a highly selective semipermeable border of endothelial cells that regulates the transfer of solutes and chemicals between the circulatory system and the central nervous system, thus protecting the brain from harmful or unwanted substances in the blood. The blood–brain barrier is formed by endothelial cells of the capillary wall, astrocyte end-feet ensheathing the capillary, and pericytes embedded in the capillary basement membrane. This system allows the passage of some small molecules by passive diffusion, as well as the selective and active transport of various nutrients, ions, organic anions, and molecules such as glucose and amino acids that are crucial to neural function.

The blood–brain barrier restricts the passage of pathogens, the diffusion of solutes in the blood, and large or hydrophilic molecules into the cerebrospinal fluid, while allowing the diffusion of hydrophobic molecules (O_{2}, CO_{2}, hormones) and small non-polar molecules. Cells of the barrier actively transport metabolic products such as glucose across the barrier using specific transport proteins. The barrier also restricts the passage of peripheral immune factors, like signaling molecules, antibodies, and immune cells, into the central nervous system, thus insulating the brain from damage due to peripheral immune events.

Specialized brain structures participating in sensory and secretory integration within brain neural circuits—the circumventricular organs and choroid plexus—have in contrast highly permeable capillaries.

== Structure ==
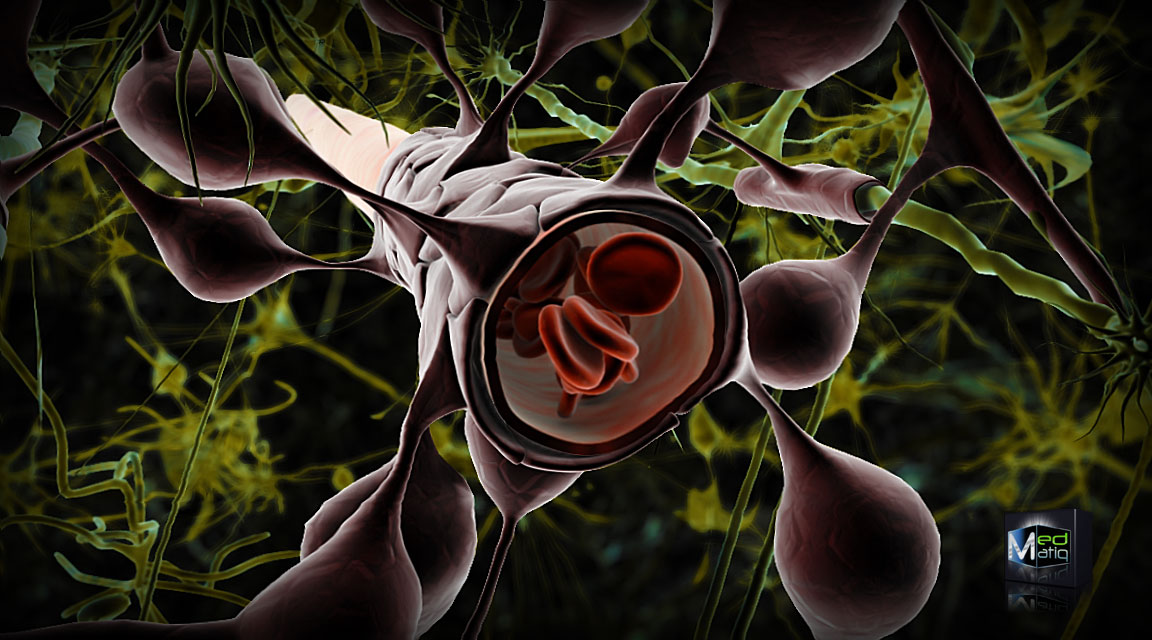
Astrocytes surrounding capillaries in the brain (artistic rendition)

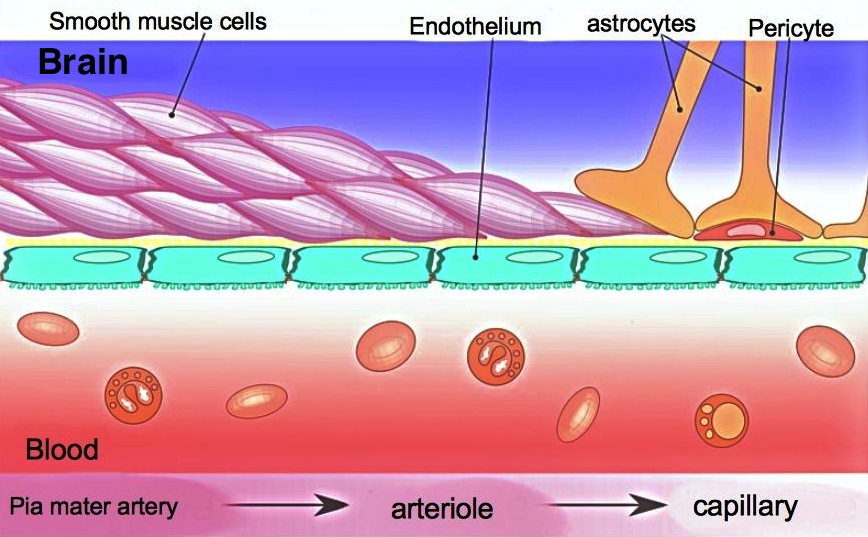
Sketch showing constitution of blood vessels inside the brain

The BBB results from the selectivity of the tight junctions between the endothelial cells of brain capillaries, restricting the passage of solutes. At the interface between blood and the brain, endothelial cells are adjoined continuously by these tight junctions, which are composed of smaller subunits of transmembrane proteins, such as occludin, claudins (such as Claudin-5), junctional adhesion molecule (such as JAM-A). Each of these tight junction proteins is stabilized to the endothelial cell membrane by another protein complex that includes scaffolding proteins such as tight junction protein 1 (ZO1) and associated proteins.

The BBB is composed of endothelial cells restricting passage of substances from the blood more selectively than endothelial cells of capillaries elsewhere in the body. Astrocyte cell projections called astrocytic feet (also known as "glia limitans") surround the endothelial cells of the BBB, providing biochemical support to those cells. The BBB is distinct from the quite similar blood-cerebrospinal fluid barrier, which is a function of the choroidal cells of the choroid plexus, and from the blood-retinal barrier, which can be considered a part of the whole realm of such barriers.

Not all vessels in the human brain exhibit BBB properties. Some examples of this include the circumventricular organs, the roof of the third and fourth ventricles, capillaries in the pineal gland on the roof of the diencephalon and the pineal gland.

=== Development ===
The BBB appears to be functional by the time of birth. P-glycoprotein, a transporter, exists already in the embryonal endothelium.

Measurement of brain uptake of various blood-borne solutes showed that newborn endothelial cells were functionally similar to those in adults, indicating that a selective BBB is operative at birth.

== Function ==
The blood–brain barrier acts effectively to protect brain tissue from circulating pathogens and other potentially toxic substances. Accordingly, blood-borne infections of the brain are rare. Infections of the brain that do occur are often difficult to treat. Antibodies are too large to cross the blood–brain barrier, and only certain antibiotics are able to pass. In some cases, a drug has to be administered directly into the cerebrospinal fluid where it can enter the brain by crossing the blood–cerebrospinal fluid barrier.

=== Circumventricular organs ===
Circumventricular organs (CVOs) are individual structures located adjacent to the fourth ventricle or third ventricle in the brain, and are characterized by dense capillary beds with permeable endothelial cells unlike those of the blood–brain barrier. Included among CVOs having highly permeable capillaries are the area postrema, subfornical organ, vascular organ of the lamina terminalis, median eminence, pineal gland, and three lobes of the pituitary gland.

Permeable capillaries of the sensory CVOs (area postrema, subfornical organ, vascular organ of the lamina terminalis) enable rapid detection of circulating signals in systemic blood, while those of the secretory CVOs (median eminence, pineal gland, pituitary lobes) facilitate transport of brain-derived signals into the circulating blood. Consequently, the CVO permeable capillaries are the point of bidirectional blood–brain communication for neuroendocrine function.

=== Specialized permeable zones ===
The border zones between brain tissue "behind" the blood–brain barrier and zones "open" to blood signals in certain CVOs contain specialized hybrid capillaries that are leakier than typical brain capillaries, but not as permeable as CVO capillaries. Such zones exist at the border of the area postrema—nucleus tractus solitarii (NTS), and median eminence—hypothalamic arcuate nucleus. These zones appear to function as rapid transit regions for brain structures involved in diverse neural circuits—like the NTS and arcuate nucleus—to receive blood signals which are then transmitted into neural output. The permeable capillary zone shared between the median eminence and hypothalamic arcuate nucleus is augmented by wide pericapillary spaces, facilitating bidirectional flow of solutes between the two structures, and indicating that the median eminence is not only a secretory organ, but may also be a sensory organ.

== Therapeutic research ==
=== As a drug target ===
The blood–brain barrier is formed by the brain capillary endothelium and excludes from the brain 100% of large-molecule neurotherapeutics and more than 98% of all small-molecule drugs. Overcoming the difficulty of delivering therapeutic agents to specific regions of the brain presents a major challenge to treatment of most brain disorders. In its neuroprotective role, the blood–brain barrier functions to hinder the delivery of many potentially important diagnostic and therapeutic agents to the brain. Therapeutic molecules and antibodies that might otherwise be effective in diagnosis and therapy do not cross the BBB in adequate amounts to be clinically effective. To overcome this problem some peptides able to naturally cross the BBB have been widely investigated as a drug delivery system.

Mechanisms for drug targeting in the brain involve going either "through" or "behind" the BBB. Modalities for drug delivery to the brain in unit doses through the BBB entail its disruption by osmotic means, or biochemically by the use of vasoactive substances, such as bradykinin, or even by localized exposure to high-intensity focused ultrasound (HIFU).

Other methods used to get through the BBB may entail the use of endogenous transport systems, including carrier-mediated transporters, such as glucose and amino acid carriers, receptor-mediated transcytosis for insulin or transferrin, and the blocking of active efflux transporters such as p-glycoprotein. Some studies have shown that vectors targeting BBB transporters, such as the transferrin receptor, have been found to remain entrapped in brain endothelial cells of capillaries, instead of being ferried across the BBB into the targeted area.

Recent studies have explored new methods of delivering drugs across the BBB to improve treatment options for neurological diseases. A study investigated the use of transferrin receptor-mediated transport to deliver an antibody targeting amyloid-beta plaques associated with Alzheimer's disease. In mice, researchers found that the method improved the delivery an distribution of the antibody throughout the brain and had reductions in amyloid-beta plaques at a lower dose. This suggests that receptor-mediated transport could help improve how scientists and doctors deliver drugs.

Recent research has also investigated allosteric targeting of transmembrane domains as an alternative way for drug delivery across the BBB. Conventional receptor-targeted approaches bind to the outer regions of receptors, while the new method uses peptides that recognize regions of receptors embedded within the cell membrane. Researchers developed peptides that targeted the transmembrane domains of insulin receptors and intergrin av. These peptides were incorporated into lipid-based drug carrier, including liposomes and lipid nanoparticles, because the fatty membrane may protect them from enzymatic degradation. The experiments used laboratory models and mice to show the modified carriers increased penetration of the BBB compared to unmodified carriers. These could potentially be used to deliver small interfering RNA, messenger RNA, and therapeutic drugs to the brain.

==== Intranasal administration ====
The brain can be targeted non-invasively via the nasal passage. The drugs that remain in the passage after mucociliary clearance, enter the brain via three pathways: (1) Olfactory nerve-olfactory bulb-brain; (2) Trigeminal nerve-brain; and (3) Lungs/ Gastrointestinal tract-blood–brain The first and second methods involve the nerves, so they use the neuronal pathway and the third is via systemic circulation. However, these methods are less efficient to deliver drugs as they are indirect methods.

==== Nanoparticles ====
Nanotechnology is under preliminary research for its potential to facilitate the transfer of drugs across the BBB. Capillary endothelial cells and associated pericytes may be abnormal in tumors and the blood–brain barrier may not always be intact in brain tumors. Other factors, such as astrocytes, may contribute to the resistance of brain tumors to therapy using nanoparticles. Fat-soluble molecules less than 400 daltons in mass can freely diffuse past the BBB through lipid-mediated passive diffusion.

=== Damage in injury and disease ===
The blood–brain barrier may become damaged in certain neurological diseases, as indicated by neuroimaging studies of Alzheimer's disease, amyotrophic lateral sclerosis, epilepsy, hemorrhagic stroke, ischemic stroke, and brain trauma, and in systemic diseases, such as liver failure. However, in many neurodegenerative diseases, the exact cause and pathology remains unknown.

== History ==
An 1898 study observed that low-concentration "bile salts" failed to affect behavior when injected into the blood of animals. Thus, in theory, the salts failed to enter the brain.

Two years later, Max Lewandowsky may have been the first to coin the term "blood–brain barrier" in 1900, referring to the hypothesized semipermeable membrane. There is some debate over the creation of the term blood–brain barrier as it is often attributed to Lewandowsky, but it does not appear in his papers. The creator of the term may have been Lina Stern. Stern was a Russian scientist who published her work in Russian and French. Due to the language barrier between her publications and English-speaking scientists, this could have made her work a lesser-known origin of the term.

All the while, bacteriologist Paul Ehrlich was studying staining, a procedure that is used in many microscopy studies to make fine biological structures visible using chemical dyes. As Ehrlich injected some of these dyes (notably the aniline dyes that were then widely used), the dye stained all of the organs of some kinds of animals except for their brains. At that time, Ehrlich attributed this lack of staining to the brain simply not picking up as much of the dye.

However, in a later experiment in 1913, Edwin Goldmann (one of Ehrlich's students) injected the dye directly into the cerebrospinal fluid of animal brains. He found then the brains did become dyed, but the rest of the body did not, demonstrating the existence of a compartmentalization between the two. At that time, it was thought that the blood vessels themselves were responsible for the barrier, since no obvious membrane could be found.

== See also ==
- Blood–ocular barrier – Physical barrier between the local blood vessels and most parts of the eye itself
- Blood–retinal barrier – Barrier in the eye that protects the retina
- Blood–saliva barrier – Semipermeable biological barrier
- Blood–spinal cord barrier – Semipermeable anatomical interface
- Blood–testis barrier – Physical barrier between the blood vessels and the seminiferous tubules of animal testes
- Brain-to-blood ratio
