= Leonarde Keeler =

Co-inventor of the polygraph

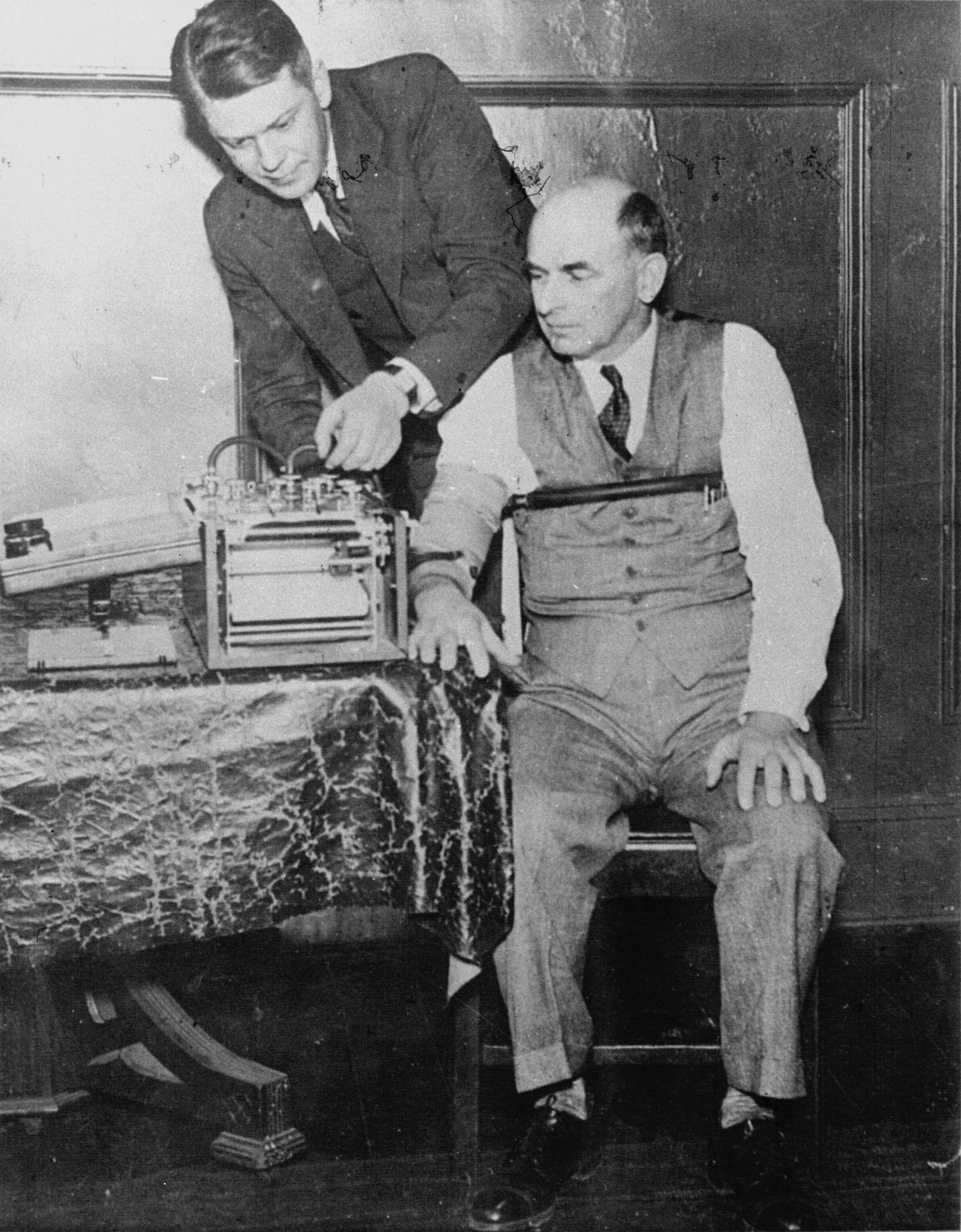
- Leonarde Keeler testing his lie-detector on a former witness for the prosecution at the trial of Richard Hauptmann in 1937
- Born: October 30, 1903; North Berkeley, Berkeley, California
- Died: September 20, 1949 (aged 45); Door County, Wisconsin
- Education: University of California, Berkeley; University of California, Los Angeles
- Occupations: Detective, inventor
- Known for: Co-inventor of the polygraph
- Spouse: Katherine Applegate (m. 1930; died 1944)

Leonarde Keeler (October 30, 1903 – September 20, 1949) was an American inventor best known for co-inventing the polygraph. He was named after the polymath Leonardo da Vinci, and preferred to be called Nard. He was a Berkeley high school student and amateur magician. He was captivated by John Augustus Larson's machine, a "cardio-pneumo psychogram", with the goal of detecting deception, and worked on it to produce the modern polygraph.

== Early life ==
He was born in 1903 in North Berkeley, California. While in high school, he worked for the Berkeley Police Department for the Chief of Police August Vollmer. He was a keen assistant to Larson who had developed a multi-tasking polygraph. After graduating from high school, he enrolled at the University of California, Berkeley in the fall of 1923. He moved shortly after that to enroll in UCLA to follow Vollmer who accepted a new job as the Chief of Police for Los Angeles.

== Invention and legacy ==
In 1924, Keeler's first handmade polygraph instrument, which he called "the Emotograph", was destroyed in a fire at his residence. On February 2, 1935, he conducted the first use of his invention, the Keeler Polygraph—otherwise known as the lie detector. Keeler used the lie detector on two criminals in Portage, Wisconsin, who were later convicted of assault when the lie detector results were introduced in court.

One of the earlier uses of the Keeler Polygraph was in 1937, in connection to the murder of 5-year-old Roger William Loomis in Lombard, Illinois. The subject was Grace Yvonne Loomis, the child's mother.

In 1938, Keeler conducted a polygraph test upon Francis Sweeney, the chief suspect in the Cleveland torso murders. Sweeney failed to pass the test, leading many to believe that he was the culprit; however, due to lack of evidence, Sweeney was never charged with the killings.

He above all was most instrumental in the popularization of modern polygraphy in criminal investigation and job screenings. He went as far as appearing in person in the 1948 film noir docudrama, Call Northside 777 with James Stewart, Richard Conte, and Lee J. Cobb, playing himself.

Keeler moved to Chicago in 1930 to work in the Scientific Crime Detection Laboratory at Northwestern University and ultimately became the head of the laboratory in 1936. He held that position until 1938 when he entered private business. He opened the first polygraph school, known as the 'Keeler Institute.' He became the first full-time private polygraph consultant.

== Personal life ==
Keeler was the son of author and naturalist Charles Keeler. He married a fellow psychology student Katherine (Kay) Applegate in 1930 in Chicago. She was trained as a forensic sleuth, becoming the nation's first female handwriting analyst. Later on, she established her own all-woman's detective agency in Chicago, specializing in forensic investigation, and left Keeler to marry another man, Rene Dussaq (1911–1996). During World War II she joined the WASPS (Women's Auxiliary Service Pilots), and died in 1944 near Patterson Field in Ohio while flying solo across the country to help halt the disbanding of the WASPs.

== Later life and death ==
Devastated by his wife's departure and later death, Keeler died in 1949 in Door County, Wisconsin, at the age of 45, after suffering a stroke brought on by stress, alcohol, and cigarettes. His contributions to the development of the polygraph are featured in the documentary film The Lie Detector which first aired on American Experience on January 3, 2023.

== Filmography ==
Title	Year	Role	Notes
Call Northside 777	1948	Leonarde Keeler - Polygraph Examiner	Uncredited
