= Sean Whitcomb =

American internet safety advocate

Sean Whitcomb is an internet safety advocate and creator of the first anti-swatting registry. He retired from American law enforcement in 2020 to pursue a career in the video game industry.

== Career ==
Whitcomb joined the Seattle Police Department in 1995, serving as a patrol officer, detective and sergeant. In 2008, Whitcomb led SPD's public affairs and digital engagement efforts until his retirement in 2020.

Upon retiring from public service, Whitcomb took a job with Sony Interactive Entertainment to focus on trust and safety within the video game industry.

== Internet Safety Advocacy ==
In 2018, following the swatting death of Andrew Finch in Wichita, Kansas, members of Seattle's online broadcaster community contacted Whitcomb, then in charge of public affairs and digital engagement for the Seattle Police Department, to express concerns about swatting.

After researching swatting prevention, Whitcomb created a system built on three core principles: improved swatting detection in the Seattle 9-1-1 Center, application of de-escalation techniques by responding patrol officers, and a confidential online registry that could be cross-checked by 9-1-1 call takers. The registry itself was built on a RaveMobile Safety platform at no extra cost to taxpayers and offered Seattle residents an opportunity to sign up for the service confidentially.

Whitcomb's concept has since been replicated by police department's beyond Seattle, including Wichita, Kansas.

In 2019, Whitcomb formed and co-chaired the Swatting Mitigation Advisory Committee, composed of both police and community members, working alongside co-chair Naveed Jamali to collect data and insights regarding swatting crimes in Seattle.

In 2020, Whitcomb joined ADL Pacific Northwest in testifying before Washington State House and Senate sub-committees in support of Washington's first law against swatting.

== Personal life ==
Whitcomb attended University of Washington and graduated in 1994 with a degree in Speech Communication, before joining the Seattle Police Department in 1995. He lives in Issaquah, Washington with his family.
