= O. W. Wilson =

American police chief (1900–1972)

Orlando Winfield Wilson
- Born: May 15, 1900; Veblen, South Dakota, U.S.
- Died: October 18, 1972 (aged 72); Poway, California, U.S.
- Education: University of California, Berkeley (BA)
- Occupations: Police superintendent; author
- Years active: 1925–1967
- Employer: Chicago Police Department
- Title: Superintendent (1960–1967)
- Military career
- Allegiance: United States of America
- Branch: United States Army
- Service years: 1939–1947
- Rank: Sergeant
- Conflicts: World War II

Orlando Winfield Wilson (May 15, 1900 – October 18, 1972), also known as O. W. Wilson, was an American police officer, later becoming a leader in policing along with authoring several books on policing. Wilson served as Superintendent of the Chicago Police Department, chief of police in Fullerton, California and Wichita, Kansas.

== Background ==
=== Early life and career ===
Wilson was born on May 15, 1900, in Veblen, South Dakota, and moved with his family to California. In 1921, Wilson enrolled in the University of California, Berkeley, majoring in criminology and studying under August Vollmer. Wilson graduated in 1924, with a Bachelor of Arts degree. While at Berkeley, he also worked as a police officer with the Berkeley Police Department; such education for a police officer was rare at the time. During World War II, Wilson served as a provost marshal with the U.S. Army and retired from the service with the rank of full colonel in the military police. Wilson remained in Europe until 1947 as an advisor to local law enforcement.

=== Policing ===
In 1925, Wilson became chief of police of the Fullerton Police Department for two years. He then spent two years as an investigator with the Pacific Finance Corporation. In 1928, at age 28, he became chief of police of the Wichita Police Department, where he served until 1939. In Wichita, he led reforms to reduce corruption. There he instituted professionalism in the department, requiring new hires to have a college education, and introduced innovations, such as the use police cars for patrol, mobile radios, and use of a mobile crime laboratory. He believed that use of two-way radio allowed for better supervision of patrol officers, and therefore more efficient policing. When the war ended, he remained in Europe until 1947, leading reorganization of police forces in Europe.

=== Chicago ===
In 1960, Chicago mayor Richard J. Daley, in the wake of a major police scandal, established a commission headed by Wilson to find a new police commissioner. In the end, Daley decided to appoint Wilson himself, as Commissioner. Beginning on March 2, 1960, Wilson served the Superintendent of Police of the Chicago Police Department until his retirement in 1967.

Reforms demanded at the outset by Wilson included establishment of a non-partisan police board to help govern the police force, a strict merit system for promotions within the department, an aggressive, nationwide recruiting drive for hiring new officers, and higher police salaries to attract professionally qualified officers. For starters, Wilson moved the superintendent's office from City Hall to Police Headquarters and closed police districts and redrew their boundaries without regard to politics. Hiring standards were raised, graft curbed, and discipline tightened, with a new Police Board overseeing it. Wilson updated the communications system, adopted computers and improved record-keeping, bought new squad cars, and eliminated most foot patrols. Police boasted of quicker response times to citizen calls. Police morale, and the public image of the police, rose. He created new programs for internal review of police misconduct, but strongly resisted efforts at civilian review of police advocated by civil rights activists.

During his tenure, Wilson recruited more African American officers, promoted black sergeants, and called for police restraint in racial conflicts. Wilson also expanded programs that targeted low-income and high-crime neighborhoods with intensified policing, including a focus on minor violations (a precursor to later "broken windows" policing strategies). Arrests of black Chicagoans increased dramatically and disproportionately during Wilson's tenure. He also advocated for the legalizing of stop and frisk practices and opposed the civil disobedience tactics of the Chicago Freedom Movement.

=== Academia ===
Wilson had also taught at Harvard University in the 1930s, working with the Harvard Bureau for Street Traffic Research. He also served as director of the New England Traffic Officers' Training School, which offered intensive two-week courses to police officers on traffic safety and enforcement. In 1939, Wilson became Professor of Police Administration at Berkeley. He served as the President of what would become the American Society of Criminology from 1942 through 1949. From 1950 to 1960, Wilson was the dean of Berkeley's School of Criminology. Wilson authored several books, including Police Records, Police Planning, and the highly influential work, Police Administration which was first published in 1943. While at Berkeley, Wilson also served as a consultant, advising cities including Dallas, Nashville, Birmingham, and Louisville, Kentucky on reorganization of their police agencies.

== Police professionalism ==
By the 1950s, Wilson's ideas of police professionalism, presented in Police Administration, were widely implemented in police agencies across the United States. These ideas remained popular until the advent of community policing. Wilson believed that preventive patrol and rapid response to calls would be effective, creating a sense of police omnipresence among criminals.

== Personal and death ==
Wilson, together with his wife Ruth Elinor Wilson, had one daughter. Wilson had another son and daughter, by a previous marriage. After retiring from the Chicago Police Department in 1967, Wilson lived in Poway, California until his death in 1972.
