= Polygraph =

Device purported to detect lies

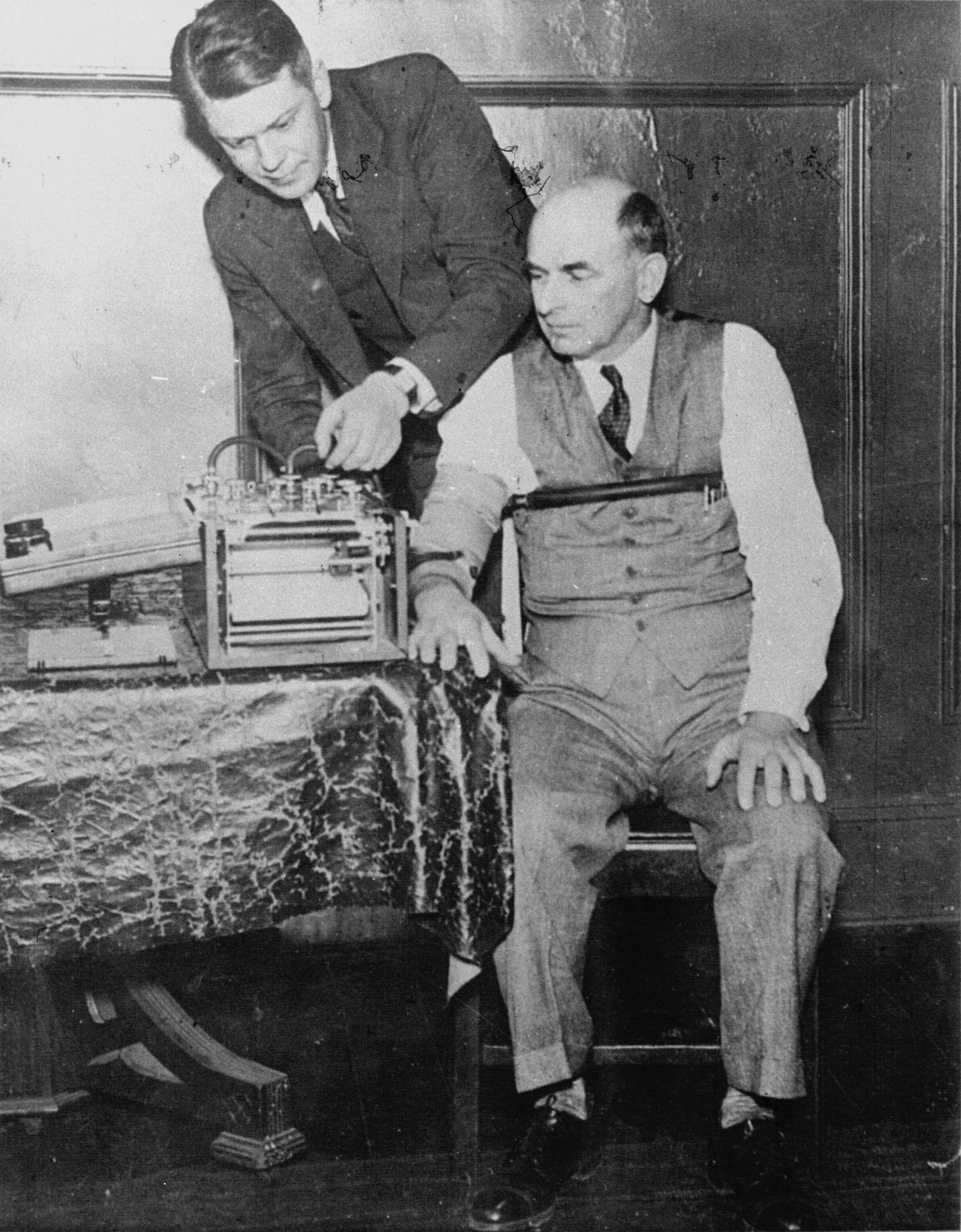
American inventor Leonarde Keeler testing his improved polygraph on Arthur Koehler, a former witness for the prosecution at the 1935 trial of Richard Hauptmann

A polygraph, often incorrectly referred to as a lie detector, is a device that measures and records several clinical biomarkers, such as blood pressure, pulse, respiratory rate, and skin conductivity, and it is used while a person answers a series of questions to purportedly detect lies. Polygraphic assessments rely on the discredited assumption that variations in physiological mechanisms or functional states, could reliably account for psychophysiological phenomena supposedly invoked by (the act of) lying. Polygraphy is considered pseudoscience by the scientific community.

The belief underpinning the use of the polygraph is that deceptive answers will produce physiological responses (mainly those connected to psychological stress) that can be differentiated from those associated with non-deceptive answers; however, there are no specific physiological reactions associated with lying, making it difficult to identify factors that separate those who are lying from those who are telling the truth. In some countries, polygraphs are used as an interrogation tool with criminal suspects or candidates for sensitive public or private sector employment. Some United States law enforcement and federal government agencies, as well as many police departments, use polygraph examinations to interrogate suspects and screen new employees. Within the US federal government, a polygraph examination is also referred to as a "psychophysiological detection of deception examination".

Assessments of polygraphy by scientific and government bodies generally suggest that polygraphs are an imperfect or invalid means of assessing truthfulness, as they may easily be defeated by countermeasures. A comprehensive 2003 review by the National Academy of Sciences of existing research concluded that there was "little basis for the expectation that a polygraph test could have extremely high accuracy", while the American Psychological Association has stated that "most psychologists agree that there is little evidence that polygraph tests can accurately detect lies." For this reason, the use of polygraphs to detect lies is considered a form of either pseudoscience or junk science.

== Testing procedure ==
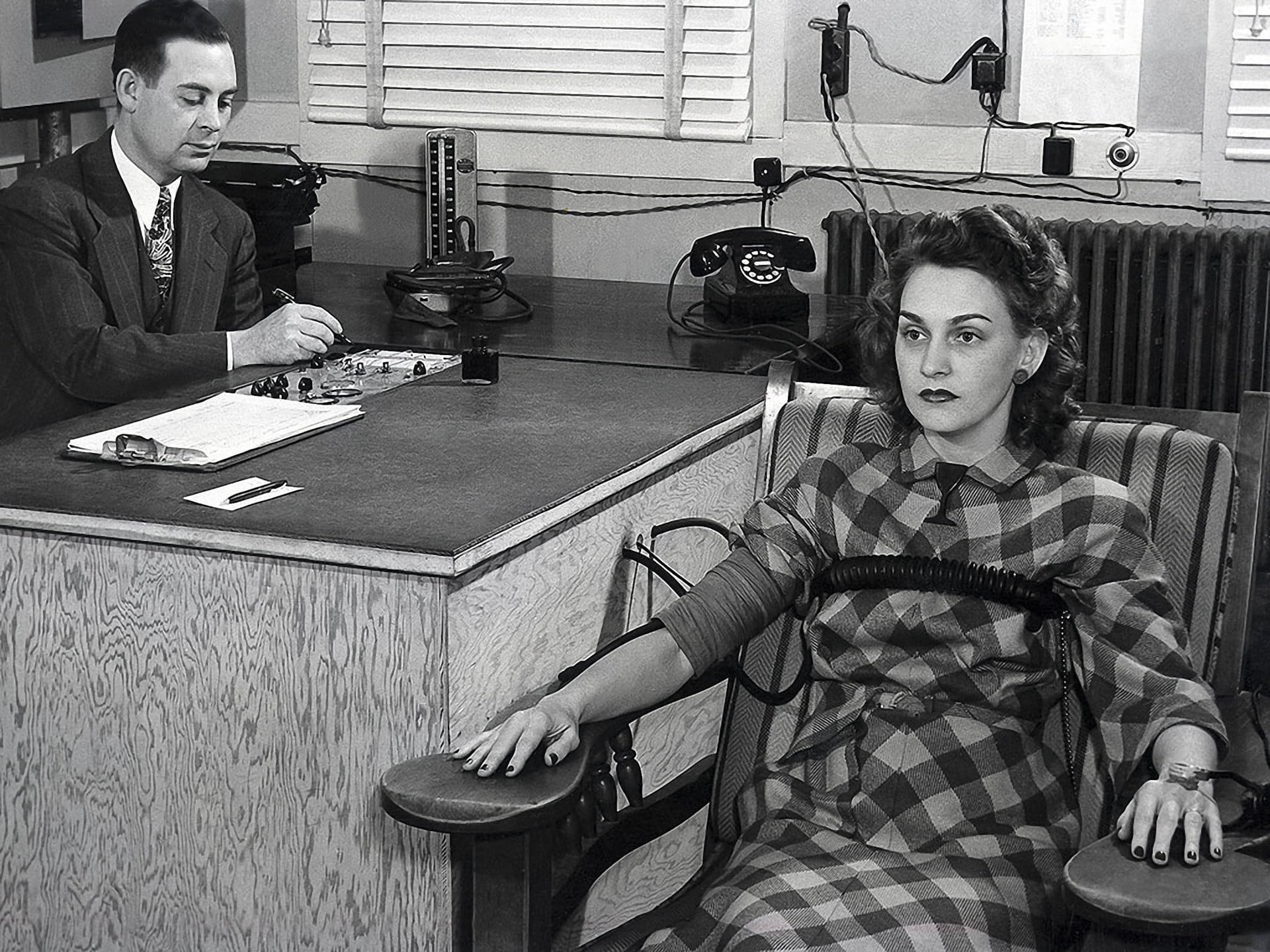
A polygraph being administered as part of the Manhattan Project, c. 1945

The examiner typically begins polygraph test sessions with a pre-test interview to gain some preliminary information which will later be used to develop diagnostic questions. Then the tester will explain how the polygraph is supposed to work, emphasizing that it can detect lies and that it is important to answer truthfully. Then a "stim test" is often conducted: the subject is asked to deliberately lie and then the tester reports that he was able to detect this lie. Guilty subjects are likely to become more anxious when they are reminded of the test's validity. However, there are risks of innocent subjects being equally or more anxious than the guilty. Then the actual test starts. Some of the questions asked are "irrelevant" ("Is your name Fred?"), others are "diagnostic" questions, and the remainder are the "relevant questions" that the tester is really interested in. The different types of questions alternate. The test is passed if the physiological responses to the diagnostic questions are equal or larger than those during the relevant questions.

Criticisms have been given regarding the validity of the administration of the Control Question Technique, mainly that the CQT may be vulnerable to being conducted in an interrogation-like fashion, and that it would elicit a nervous response from innocent and guilty suspects alike.

An alternative is the Guilty Knowledge Test (GKT), or the Concealed Information Test, which is used in Japan. The administration of this test is given to prevent potential errors that may arise from the questioning style. The test is usually conducted by a tester with no knowledge of the crime or circumstances in question. The administrator tests the participant on their knowledge of the crime that would not be known to an innocent person. For example: "Was the crime committed with a .45 or a 9 mm?" The questions are in multiple choice and the participant is rated on how they react to the correct answer. If they react strongly to the guilty information, then proponents of the test believe that it is likely that they know facts relevant to the case. This administration is considered more valid by supporters of the test because it contains many safeguards to avoid the risk of the administrator influencing the results.

== Effectiveness ==
Assessments of polygraphy by scientific and government bodies generally suggest that polygraphs are inaccurate, may be defeated by countermeasures, and are an imperfect or invalid means of assessing truthfulness. Despite claims that polygraph tests are between 80% and 90% accurate by advocates, the National Research Council has found no evidence of effectiveness. In particular, studies have indicated that the relevant–irrelevant questioning technique is not ideal, as many innocent subjects exert a heightened physiological reaction to the crime-relevant questions. The American Psychological Association states "Most psychologists agree that there is little evidence that polygraph tests can accurately detect lies."

In 2002, a review by the National Research Council found that, in populations "untrained in countermeasures, specific-incident polygraph tests can discriminate lying from truth telling at rates well above chance, though well below perfection". The review also warns against generalization from these findings to justify the use of polygraphs—"polygraph accuracy for screening purposes is almost certainly lower than what can be achieved by specific-incident polygraph tests in the field"—and notes some examinees may be able to take countermeasures to produce deceptive results.

In the 1998 US Supreme Court case United States v. Scheffer, the majority stated that "There is simply no consensus that polygraph evidence is reliable [...] Unlike other expert witnesses who testify about factual matters outside the jurors' knowledge, such as the analysis of fingerprints, ballistics, or DNA found at a crime scene, a polygraph expert can supply the jury only with another opinion." The Supreme Court summarized their findings by stating that the use of polygraph was "little better than could be obtained by the toss of a coin." In 2005, the 11th Circuit Court of Appeals stated that "polygraphy did not enjoy general acceptance from the scientific community". In 2001, William Iacono, Professor of Psychology and Neuroscience at the University of Minnesota, concluded:

Although the CQT [Control Question Test] may be useful as an investigative aid and tool to induce confessions or to indicate details to pay attention to, it does not pass muster as a scientifically credible test of truthfulness. CQT theory is based on naive, implausible assumptions indicating (a) that it is biased against innocent individuals and (b) that it can be beaten simply by artificially augmenting responses to control questions. Although it is not possible to adequately assess the error rate of the CQT, both of these conclusions are supported by published research findings in the best social science journals (Honts et al., 1994; Horvath, 1977; Kleinmuntz & Szucko, 1984; Patrick & Iacono, 1991). Although defense attorneys often attempt to have the results of friendly CQTs admitted as evidence in court, there is no evidence supporting their validity and ample reason to doubt it. Members of scientific organizations who have the requisite background to evaluate the CQT are overwhelmingly skeptical of the claims made by polygraph proponents.

Polygraphs measure arousal, which can be affected by anxiety, anxiety disorders such as post-traumatic stress disorder (PTSD), nervousness, fear, confusion, hypoglycemia, psychosis, depression, substance-induced states (nicotine, stimulants), substance-withdrawal state (alcohol withdrawal) or other emotions; polygraphs do not measure "lies". A polygraph cannot differentiate anxiety caused by dishonesty and anxiety caused by something else.

Since the polygraph does not measure lying, the Silent Talker Lie Detector inventors expected that adding a camera to film microexpressions would improve the accuracy of the evaluators. This did not happen in practice according to an article in the Intercept.

=== US Congress Office of Technology Assessment ===
In 1983, the US Congress Office of Technology Assessment published a review of the technology and found that

there is at present only limited scientific evidence for establishing the validity of polygraph testing. Even where the evidence seems to indicate that polygraph testing detects deceptive subjects better than chance, significant error rates are possible, and examiner and examinee differences and the use of countermeasures may further affect validity.

=== National Academy of Sciences ===
In 2003, the National Academy of Sciences (NAS) issued a report entitled "The Polygraph and Lie Detection". The NAS found that "overall, the evidence is scanty and scientifically weak", concluding that 57 of the approximately 80 research studies that the American Polygraph Association relied on to reach their conclusions were significantly flawed. These studies did show that specific-incident polygraph testing, in a person untrained in counter-measures, could discern the truth at "a level greater than chance, yet short of perfection". However, due to several flaws, the levels of accuracy shown in these studies "are almost certainly higher than actual polygraph accuracy of specific-incident testing in the field". By adding a camera, the Silent Talker Lie Detector attempted to give more data to the evaluator by providing information about microexpressions. However adding the Silent Talker camera did not improve lie detection and was very expensive and cumbersome to include according to an article in the Intercept.

When polygraphs are used as a screening tool (in national security matters and for law enforcement agencies for example) the level of accuracy drops to such a level that "Its accuracy in distinguishing actual or potential security violators from innocent test takers is insufficient to justify reliance on its use in employee security screening in federal agencies." The NAS concluded that the polygraph "may have some utility but that there is "little basis for the expectation that a polygraph test could have extremely high accuracy".

The NAS conclusions paralleled those of the earlier United States Congress Office of Technology Assessment report "Scientific Validity of Polygraph Testing: A Research Review and Evaluation". Similarly, a report to Congress by the Moynihan Commission on Government Secrecy concluded that "The few Government-sponsored scientific research reports on polygraph validity (as opposed to its utility), especially those focusing on the screening of applicants for employment, indicate that the polygraph is neither scientifically valid nor especially effective beyond its ability to generate admissions".

Despite the NAS finding of a "high rate of false positives," failures to expose individuals such as Aldrich Ames and Larry Wu-Tai Chin, and other inabilities to show a scientific justification for the use of the polygraph, it continues to be employed.

== Countermeasures ==
Several proposed countermeasures designed to pass polygraph tests have been described. There are two major types of countermeasures: "general state" (intending to alter the physiological or psychological state of the subject during the test), and "specific point" (intending to alter the physiological or psychological state of the subject at specific periods during the examination, either to increase or decrease responses during critical examination periods).

- General state: When asked how he passed the polygraph test, Central Intelligence Agency officer turned KGB mole Aldrich Ames explained that he sought advice from his Soviet handler and received the simple instruction to: "Get a good night's sleep, and rest, and go into the test rested and relaxed. Be nice to the polygraph examiner, develop a rapport, and be cooperative and try to maintain your calm". Additionally, Ames explained, "There's no special magic... Confidence is what does it. Confidence and a friendly relationship with the examiner... rapport, where you smile and you make him think that you like him".
- Specific point: Other suggestions for countermeasures include for the subject to mentally record the control and relevant questions as the examiner reviews them before the interrogation begins. During the interrogation the subject is supposed to carefully control their breathing while answering the relevant questions, and to try to artificially increase their heart rate during the control questions, for example by thinking of something scary or exciting, or by pricking themselves with a pointed object concealed somewhere on the body. In this way the results will not show a significant reaction to any of the relevant questions.

== Use ==
Law enforcement agencies and intelligence agencies in the United States are by far the largest users of polygraph technology. In the United States alone most federal law enforcement agencies either employ their own polygraph examiners or use the services of examiners employed by other agencies. In 1978 Richard Helms, the eighth Director of Central Intelligence, stated:

We discovered there were some Eastern Europeans who could defeat the polygraph at any time. Americans are not very good at it, because we are raised to tell the truth and when we lie it is easy to tell we are lying. But we find a lot of Europeans and Asiatics can handle that polygraph without a blip, and you know they are lying and you have evidence that they are lying.

Susan McCarthy of Salon said in 2000 that "The polygraph is an American phenomenon, with limited use in a few countries, such as Canada, Israel and Japan."

=== Armenia ===
In Armenia, government administered polygraphs are legal, at least for use in national security investigations. The National Security Service (NSS), Armenia's primary intelligence service, requires polygraph examinations of all new applicants.

=== Australia ===
Polygraph evidence became inadmissible in New South Wales courts under the Lie Detectors Act 1983. Under the same act, it is also illegal to use polygraphs for the purpose of granting employment, insurance, financial accommodation, and several other purposes for which polygraphs may be used in other jurisdictions.

=== Canada ===
In Canada, the 1987 decision of R v Béland, the Supreme Court of Canada rejected the use of polygraph results as evidence in court, finding that they were inadmissible. The polygraph is still used as a tool in the investigation of criminal acts and sometimes employed in the screening of employees for government organizations.

In the province of Ontario, the Employment Standards Act, 2000 prohibits employers from asking or requiring employees to undergo a polygraph test. Police services are permitted to use polygraph tests as part of an investigation if the person consents.

=== Europe ===
In a majority of European jurisdictions, polygraphs are generally considered to be unreliable for gathering evidence, and are usually not used by local law enforcement agencies. Polygraph testing is widely seen in Europe to violate the right to remain silent.

In England and Wales a polygraph test can be taken, but the results cannot be used in a court of law to prove a case. However, the Offender Management Act 2007 put in place an option to use polygraph tests to monitor serious sex offenders on parole in England and Wales; these tests became compulsory in 2014 for high risk sexual offenders currently on parole in England and Wales. That is a pilot test, failing a polygraph test cannot be used as evidence against the suspect, but confessions made during polygraph examination can.

The Supreme Court of Poland declared on January 29, 2015, that the use of polygraph in interrogation of suspects is forbidden by the Polish Code of Criminal Procedure. Its use might be allowed though if the suspect has been already accused of a crime and if the interrogated person consents to the use of a polygraph. Even then, the use of polygraph can never be used as a substitute for actual evidence.

As of 2017, the justice ministry and Supreme Court of both of the Netherlands and Germany had rejected use of polygraphs.

According to the 2017 book Psychology and Law: Bridging the Gap by psychologists David Canter and Rita Žukauskienė Belgium was the European country with the most prevalent use of polygraph testing by police, with about 300 polygraphs carried out each year in the course of police investigations. The results are not considered viable evidence in bench trials, but have been used in jury trials.

In Lithuania, polygraphs have been in use since 1992, with law enforcement utilizing the Event Knowledge Test (a "modification" of the Concealed Information Test) in criminal investigations.

In Romanian justice a polygraph test can be refused by anyone, for no reason at all, and even accepting to submit to a polygraph test is not binding. It is not strictly speaking evidence, just an expert opinion. It has been used recently in famous cases, but only voluntarily.

=== India ===
In 2008, an Indian court adopted the Brain Electrical Oscillation Signature Profiling test as evidence to convict a woman who was accused of murdering her fiancé. It was the first time that the result of polygraph was used as evidence in court. On May 5, 2010, The Supreme Court of India declared use of narcoanalysis, brain mapping and polygraph tests on suspects as illegal and against the constitution if consent is not obtained and forced. Article 20(3) of the Indian Constitution states: "No person accused of any offence shall be compelled to be a witness against himself." Polygraph tests are still legal if the defendant requests one.

=== Israel ===
The Supreme Court of Israel, in Civil Appeal 551/89 (Menora Insurance v. Jacob Sdovnik), ruled that the polygraph has not been recognized as a reliable device. In other decisions, polygraph results were ruled inadmissible in criminal trials. Polygraph results are only admissible in civil trials if the person being tested agrees to it in advance.

=== Philippines ===
The results of polygraph tests are inadmissible in court in the Philippines. The National Bureau of Investigation, however, uses polygraphs in aid of investigation.

=== United States ===
Brochure of the Defense Security Service (DSS) about polygraph testing

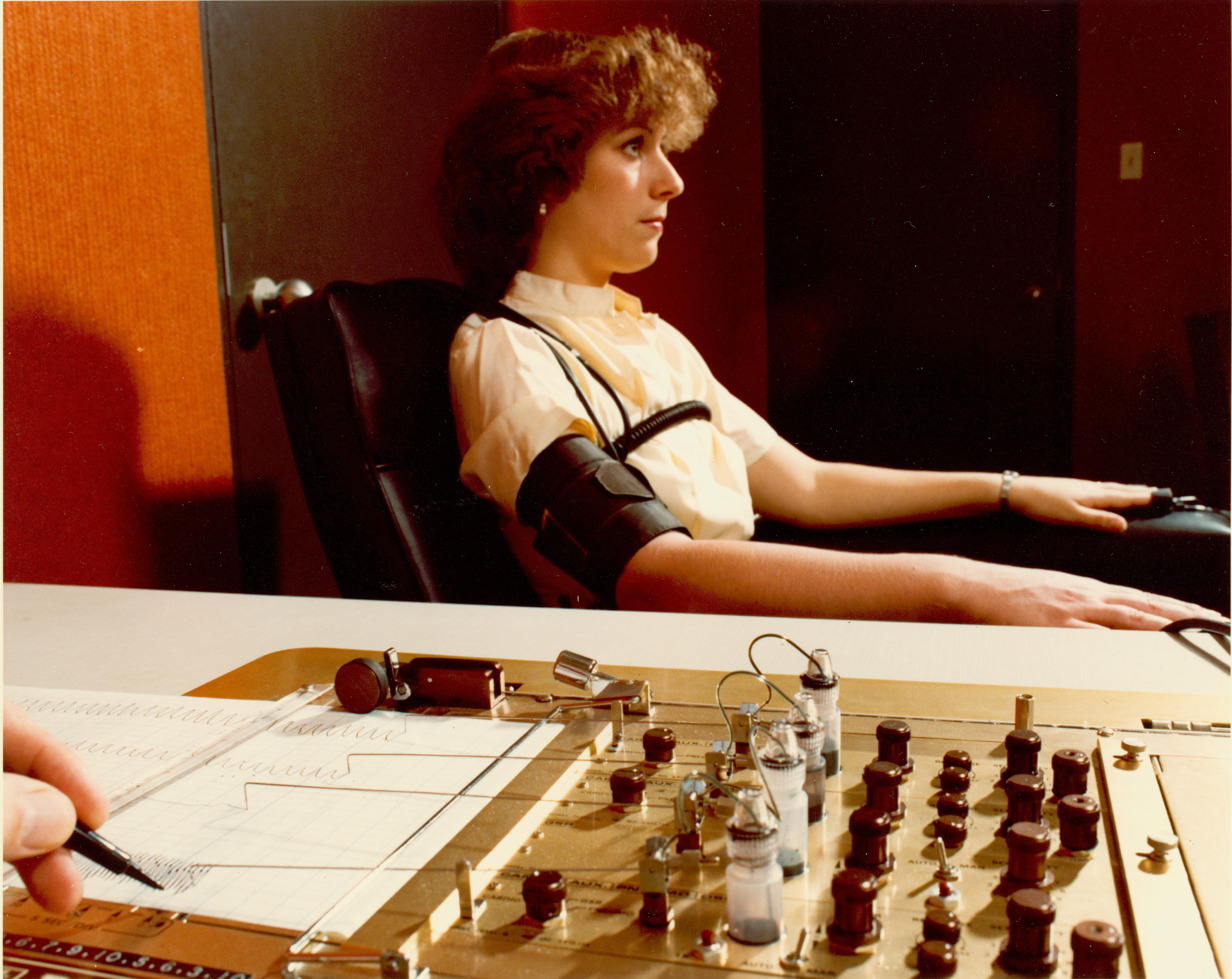
Demonstrating the administration of the polygraph, the polygrapher making notes on the readouts. 1970s

"The Truth About the Polygraph" (National Security Agency (NSA)-produced video on the polygraph process)

In 2018, Wired magazine reported that an estimated 2.5 million polygraph tests were given each year in the United States, with the majority administered to paramedics, police officers, firefighters, and state troopers. The average cost to administer the test is more than $700 and is part of a $2 billion industry.

In 2007, polygraph testimony was admitted by stipulation in 19 states, and was subject to the discretion of the trial judge in federal court. The use of polygraph in court testimony remains controversial, although it is used extensively in post-conviction supervision, particularly of sex offenders. In Daubert v. Merrell Dow Pharmaceuticals, Inc. (1993), the old Frye standard was lifted and all forensic evidence, including polygraph, had to meet the new Daubert standard in which "underlying reasoning or methodology is scientifically valid and properly can be applied to the facts at issue." While polygraph tests are commonly used in police investigations in the US, no defendant or witness can be forced to undergo the test unless they are under the supervision of the courts. In United States v. Scheffer (1998), the US Supreme Court left it up to individual jurisdictions whether polygraph results could be admitted as evidence in court cases. Nevertheless, it is used extensively by prosecutors, defense attorneys, and law enforcement agencies. In the states of Rhode Island, Massachusetts, Maryland, New Jersey, Oregon, Delaware and Iowa it is illegal for any employer to order a polygraph either as conditions to gain employment, or if an employee has been suspected of wrongdoing. The Employee Polygraph Protection Act of 1988 (EPPA) generally prevents employers from using lie detector tests, either for pre-employment screening or during the course of employment, with certain exemptions. As of 2013, about 70,000 job applicants are polygraphed by the federal government on an annual basis. In the United States, the State of New Mexico admits polygraph testing in jury trials under certain circumstances.

In 2010 the NSA produced a video explaining its polygraph process. The video, ten minutes long, is titled "The Truth About the Polygraph" and was posted to the website of the Defense Security Service. Jeff Stein of The Washington Post said that the video portrays "various applicants, or actors playing them—it's not clear—describing everything bad they had heard about the test, the implication being that none of it is true." AntiPolygraph.org argues that the NSA-produced video omits some information about the polygraph process; it produced a video responding to the NSA video. George Maschke, the founder of the website, accused the NSA polygraph video of being "Orwellian".

The polygraph was invented in 1921 by John Augustus Larson, a medical student at the University of California, Berkeley and a police officer of the Berkeley Police Department in Berkeley, California. The polygraph was on the Encyclopædia Britannica 2003 list of greatest inventions, described as inventions that "have had profound effects on human life for better or worse." In 2013, the US federal government had begun indicting individuals who stated that they were teaching methods on how to defeat a polygraph test. During one of those investigations, upwards of 30 federal agencies were involved in investigations of almost 5000 people who had various degrees of contact with those being prosecuted or who had purchased books or DVDs on the topic of beating polygraph tests.

== Security clearances ==
In 1995, Harold James Nicholson, a Central Intelligence Agency (CIA) employee later convicted of spying for Russia, had undergone his periodic five-year reinvestigation, in which he showed a strong probability of deception on questions regarding relationships with a foreign intelligence unit. This polygraph test later led to an investigation which resulted in his eventual arrest and conviction. In most cases, however, polygraphs are more of a tool to "scare straight" those who would consider espionage. Jonathan Pollard was advised by his Israeli handlers that he was to resign his job from American intelligence if he was ever told he was subject to a polygraph test. Likewise, John Anthony Walker was advised by his handlers not to engage in espionage until he had been promoted to the highest position for which a polygraph test was not required, to refuse promotion to higher positions for which polygraph tests were required, and to retire when promotion was mandated.

In 1983, CIA employee Edward Lee Howard was dismissed when, during a polygraph screening, he truthfully answered a series of questions admitting to minor crimes such as petty theft and drug abuse. In retaliation for his perceived unjust punishment for minor offenses, he later sold his knowledge of CIA operations to the Soviet Union.

Polygraph tests may not deter espionage. From 1945 to the present, at least six Americans have committed espionage while successfully passing polygraph tests. Notable cases of two men who created a false negative result with the polygraphs were Larry Wu-Tai Chin, who spied for China, and Aldrich Ames, who was given two polygraph examinations while with the CIA, the first in 1986 and the second in 1991, while spying for the Soviet Union/Russia. The CIA reported that he passed both examinations after experiencing initial indications of deception. According to a Senate investigation, an FBI review of the first examination concluded that the indications of deception were never resolved.

Ana Belen Montes, a Cuban spy, passed a counterintelligence scope polygraph test administered by the US Defense Intelligence Agency (DIA) in 1994.

Despite these errors, in August 2008, the DIA announced that it would subject each of its 5,700 prospective and current employees to polygraph testing at least once annually. This expansion of polygraph screening at DIA occurred while DIA polygraph managers ignored documented technical problems discovered in the Lafayette computerized polygraph system. The DIA uses computerized Lafayette polygraph systems for routine counterintelligence testing. The impact of the technical flaws within the Lafayette system on the analysis of recorded physiology and on the final polygraph test evaluation is currently unknown.

In 2012, a McClatchy investigation found that the National Reconnaissance Office was possibly breaching ethical and legal boundaries by encouraging its polygraph examiners to extract personal and private information from US Department of Defense personnel during polygraph tests that purported to be limited in scope to counterintelligence matters. Allegations of abusive polygraph practices were brought forward by former NRO polygraph examiners.

== Alternative tests ==
Most polygraph researchers have focused more on the exam's predictive value on a subject's guilt. However, there have been no empirical theories established to explain how a polygraph measures deception. A 2010 study indicated that functional magnetic resonance imaging (fMRI) may benefit in explaining the psychological correlations of polygraph exams. It could also explain which parts of the brain are active when subjects use artificial memories. Most brain activity occurs in both sides of the prefrontal cortex, which is linked to response inhibition. This indicates that deception may involve inhibition of truthful responses. Some researchers believe that reaction time (RT) based tests may replace polygraphs in concealed information detection. RT based tests differ from polygraphs in stimulus presentation duration and can be conducted without physiological recording as subject response time is measured via computer. However, researchers have found limitations to these tests as subjects voluntarily control their reaction time, deception can still occur within the response deadline, and the test itself lacks physiological recording.

== History ==
Earlier societies utilized elaborate methods of lie detection which mainly involved torture. For instance, in the Middle Ages, boiling water was used to detect liars, as it was believed honest men would withstand it better than liars. Early devices for lie detection include an 1895 invention of Cesare Lombroso used to measure changes in blood pressure for police cases, a 1904 device by Vittorio Benussi used to measure breathing, the Mackenzie-Lewis Polygraph first developed by James Mackenzie in 1906 and an abandoned project by American William Moulton Marston which used blood pressure to examine German prisoners of war (POWs). Marston said he found a strong positive correlation between systolic blood pressure and lying.

Marston wrote a second paper on the concept in 1915, when finishing his undergraduate studies. He entered Harvard Law School and graduated in 1918, re-publishing his earlier work in 1917. Marston's main inspiration for the device was his wife, Elizabeth Holloway Marston. "According to Marston's son, it was his mother Elizabeth, Marston's wife, who suggested to him that 'When she got mad or excited, her blood pressure seemed to climb'" (Lamb, 2001). Although Elizabeth is not listed as Marston's collaborator in his early work, Lamb, Matte (1996), and others refer directly and indirectly to Elizabeth's work on her husband's deception research. She also appears in a picture taken in his polygraph laboratory in the 1920s (reproduced in Marston, 1938).

Despite his predecessors' contributions, Marston styled himself the "father of the polygraph". (Today he is often equally or more noted as the creator of the comic book character Wonder Woman and her Lasso of Truth, which can force people to tell the truth.) Marston remained the device's primary advocate, lobbying for its use in the courts. In 1938 he published a book, The Lie Detector Test, wherein he documented the theory and use of the device. In 1938 he appeared in advertising by the Gillette company claiming that the polygraph showed Gillette razors were better than the competition.

A device recording both blood pressure and breathing was invented in 1921 by medical student John Augustus Larson of the University of California, Berkeley and first applied in law enforcement work by the Berkeley Police Department under its nationally renowned police chief August Vollmer. Further work on this device was done by Leonarde Keeler. As Larson's protege, Keeler updated the device by making it portable and added the galvanic skin response to it in 1939. His device was then purchased by the FBI, and served as the prototype of the modern polygraph.

Several devices similar to Keeler's polygraph version included the Berkeley Psychograph, a blood pressure-pulse-respiration recorder developed by C. D. Lee in 1936 and the Darrow Behavior Research Photopolygraph, which was developed and intended solely for behavior research experiments.

A device which recorded muscular activity accompanying changes in blood pressure was developed in 1945 by John E. Reid, who claimed that greater accuracy could be obtained by making these recordings simultaneously with standard blood pressure-pulse-respiration recordings.

== Society and culture ==
=== Portrayals in media ===
Lie detection has a long history in mythology and fairy tales; the polygraph has allowed modern fiction to use a device more easily seen as scientific and plausible. Notable instances of polygraph usage include uses in crime and espionage themed television shows and some daytime television talk shows, cartoons and films. Numerous TV shows have been called Lie Detector or featured the device. The first Lie Detector TV show aired in the 1950s, created and hosted by Ralph Andrews. In the 1960s Andrews produced a series of specials hosted by Melvin Belli. In the 1970s the show was hosted by Jack Anderson. In early 1983 Columbia Pictures Television put on a syndicated series hosted by F. Lee Bailey. In 1998 TV producer Mark Phillips with his Mark Phillips Philms & Telephision put Lie Detector back on the air on the FOX Network—on that program Ed Gelb with host Marcia Clark questioned Mark Fuhrman about the allegation that he "planted the bloody glove". In 2005 Phillips produced Lie Detector as a series for PAX/ION; some of the guests included Paula Jones, Reverend Paul Crouch accuser Lonny Ford, Ben Rowling, Jeff Gannon, and Swift Boat Vet Steve Garner.

In the UK, shows such as The Jeremy Kyle Show used polygraph tests extensively. The show was ultimately canceled when a participant committed suicide shortly after being polygraphed. The guest was slated by Kyle on the show for failing the polygraph, but no other evidence has come forward to prove any guilt. Producers later admitted in the inquiry that they were unsure on how accurate the tests performed were.

In the Fox game show The Moment of Truth, contestants are privately asked personal questions a few days before the show while hooked to a polygraph. On the show they asked the same questions in front of a studio audience and members of their family. In order to advance in the game they must give a "truthful" answer as determined by the previous polygraph exam.

Daytime talk shows, such as Maury Povich and Steve Wilkos, have used polygraphs to supposedly detect deception in interview subjects on their programs that pertain to cheating, child abuse, and theft.

In episode 93 of the US science show MythBusters, the hosts attempted to fool the polygraph by using pain when answering truthfully, in order to test the notion that polygraphs interpret truthful and non-truthful answers as the same. They also attempted to fool the polygraph by thinking pleasant thoughts when lying and thinking stressful thoughts when telling the truth, to try to confuse the machine. However, neither technique was successful for a number of reasons. Michael Martin correctly identified each guilty and innocent subject. Martin suggested that when conducted properly, polygraphs are correct 98% of the time, but no scientific evidence has been offered for this.

The history of the polygraph is the subject of the documentary film The Lie Detector, which first aired on American Experience on January 3, 2023.

=== Hand-held lie detector for US military ===
A hand-held lie detector is being deployed by the US Department of Defense according to a report in 2008 by investigative reporter Bill Dedman of NBC News. The Preliminary Credibility Assessment Screening System, or PCASS, captures less physiological information than a polygraph, and uses an algorithm, not the judgment of a polygraph examiner, to render a decision whether it believes the person is being deceptive or not. The device was first used in Afghanistan by US Army troops. The Department of Defense ordered its use be limited to non-US persons, in overseas locations only.

=== Notable cases ===
Polygraphy has been faulted for failing to trap known spies such as double-agent Aldrich Ames, who passed two polygraph tests while spying for the Soviet Union. Ames failed several tests while at the CIA that were never acted on. Other spies who passed the polygraph include Karl Koecher, Ana Montes, and Leandro Aragoncillo. CIA spy Harold James Nicholson failed his polygraph examinations, which aroused suspicions that led to his eventual arrest. Polygraph examination and background checks failed to detect Nada Nadim Prouty, who was not a spy but was convicted for improperly obtaining US citizenship and using it to obtain a restricted position at the FBI.

The polygraph also failed to catch Gary Ridgway, the "Green River Killer". Another suspect allegedly failed a given lie detector test, whereas Ridgway passed. Ridgway passed a polygraph in 1984; he confessed almost 20 years later when confronted with DNA evidence. Conversely, innocent people have been known to fail polygraph tests. In Wichita, Kansas in 1986, Bill Wegerle was suspected of murdering his wife Vicki Wegerle because he failed two polygraph tests (one administered by the police, the other conducted by an expert that Wegerle had hired), although he was neither arrested nor convicted of her death. In March 2004, evidence surfaced connecting her death to the serial killer known as BTK, and in 2005 DNA evidence from the Wegerle murder confirmed that BTK was Dennis Rader, exonerating Wegerle.

Prolonged polygraph examinations are sometimes used as a tool by which confessions are extracted from a defendant, as in the case of Richard Miller, who was persuaded to confess largely by polygraph results combined with appeals from a religious leader. In the Watts family murders, Christopher Watts failed one such polygraph test and subsequently confessed to murdering his wife. In the 2002 disappearance of seven-year-old Danielle van Dam of San Diego, police suspected neighbor David Westerfield; he became the prime suspect when he allegedly failed a polygraph test.

== See also ==
- Bogus pipeline
- Cleve Backster
- Doug Williams (polygraph critic)
- Ecological fallacy
- Ronald Pelton
- Voice stress analysis
- P300 (neuroscience)#Applications
