= United States v. Scheffer =

- Supreme Court of the United States

Argued November 3, 1997 Decided March 31, 1998
- Full case name: United States v. Edward G. Scheffer
- Citations: 523 U.S. 303 (more) 118 S. Ct. 1261; 140 L. Ed. 2d 413; 6 U.S.L.W. 4235; 98 Cal. Daily Op. Service 2329; 98 Daily Journal DAR 3183; 1998 Colo. J. C.A.R. 1548; 11 Fla. L. Weekly Fed. S 421

Case history
- Prior: 44 M.J. 442 (reversed)

Holding
- Military Rule of Evidence 707, which makes polygraph evidence inadmissible in court-martial proceedings, does not unconstitutionally abridge the right of accused members of the military to present a defense.

Court membership
- Chief Justice William Rehnquist Associate Justices John P. Stevens · Sandra Day O'Connor; Antonin Scalia · Anthony Kennedy; David Souter · Clarence Thomas; Ruth Bader Ginsburg · Stephen Breyer

Case opinions
- Majority: Thomas, joined by Rehnquist, O'Connor, Scalia, Kennedy, Souter, Ginsburg, Breyer (Parts I, II-A, and II-D)
- Plurality: Thomas, joined by Rehnquist, Scalia, Souter (Parts II-B and II-C)
- Concurrence: Kennedy, joined by O'Connor, Ginsburg, Breyer (in part and in the result)
- Dissent: Stevens

Laws applied
- U.S. Const. amend. VI

United States v. Scheffer, 523 U.S. 303 (1998), was the first case in which the Supreme Court issued a ruling with regard to the highly controversial matter of polygraph, or "lie-detector," testing. At issue was whether the per se exclusion of polygraph evidence offered by the accused in a military court violates the Sixth Amendment right to present a defense.

== Opinion of the Court ==
The Court ruled that Military Rule of Evidence 707, which makes polygraph evidence inadmissible in court-martial proceedings, does not unconstitutionally abridge the right of accused members of the military to present a defense.

== Significance ==
The United States v. Scheffer ruling came, as legal writer Joan Biskupic noted in the Washington Post, "at a time when polygraph machines are increasingly being used outside the courtroom" — and inside as well. Prosecutors were using polygraph results "to extract confessions from suspects," Biskupic observed, and defense lawyers were using "them for leverage in plea bargains"; likewise polygraph tests were being subjected to greater and greater use in the workplace. Employers were using them to test job applicants with regard to past wrongdoing, and to monitor present jobholders as well (although this practice was mostly outlawed in 1988 by the Employee Polygraph Protection Act). While the latter practice might raise Fourth Amendment questions of its own, the use of polygraph results in the courtroom had become a battleground for opposing factions of evidentiary experts.

== See also ==
- List of United States Supreme Court cases, volume 523
- List of United States Supreme Court cases
- Lists of United States Supreme Court cases by volume
