= School shooting hoax =

Type of false police report

A school shooting hoax is a false report (swatting) to police about a mass shooting, bomb threat, or hostage situation occurring at a school or any educational institution. These events have been most frequently seen in the United States, due to the U.S. having the highest rate of school shootings.

Swatting incidents divert first responders for real emergencies, spiking fear in students and wasting police resources.

== In the United States ==
In the 2022-2023 school year, 63.8% of all violent incidents were false active shooter reports, with a 546% increase from the 2018-2019 school year. In this period, false shooter reports were the most frequent violent incidents at schools.

In February 2022, nine schools in Michigan received false active shooter warnings.

In 2025, there have been false school shooting warnings at the University of Arkansas, University of Colorado Boulder, Iowa State University, Kansas State University, the University of New Hampshire, and Northern Arizona University.
