= John Augustus Larson =

American police officer and inventor (1892–1965)

- John Larson in 1921
- Born: December 11, 1892; Shelburne, Nova Scotia, Canada
- Died: October 1, 1965 (aged 72); Nashville, Tennessee
- Citizenship: U.S.
- Education: Boston University (M.Sc., 1915); University of California, Berkeley (Ph.D., 1920) Rush Medical College (M.D.)
- Alma mater: University of California, Berkeley, Rush Medical College
- Occupations: Police Officer, Forensic Psychiatrist
- Known for: Criminology, Polygraphy
- Scientific career
- Fields: Medicine; Criminology
- Workplaces: Berkeley Police Department

John Augustus Larson (11 December 1892 – 1 October 1965) was a police officer and forensic psychiatrist and became famous for his invention of the modern polygraph device used in forensic investigations. He was the first American police officer with an academic doctorate and to use the polygraph in criminal investigations. After a famed career in criminal investigation, he died of a heart attack in Nashville, Tennessee, at the age of 73.

== Early life and career ==
Larson was born in Shelburne, Nova Scotia, Canada, to Swedish parents. His family moved to New England in his early childhood, though his parents soon divorced. He studied biology at Boston University holding down odd jobs to support himself, ranging from busboy and paperboy to stonecutter and elevator operator. In 1915, he earned a master's degree with a thesis on fingerprint identification. This work inspired his interest in forensic science and led him to the University of California, Berkeley, where he obtained a Ph.D. in physiology in 1920.

Having done moonlighting work as a student for the Berkeley Police Department, he joined the force in 1920. His great insight was to integrate a test for blood pressure, developed by William Moulton Marston, with measurements for pulse, respiration and skin conductivity, to make a comprehensive lie detection tool. He was also highly encouraged by his police chief August Vollmer.

Larson later went to medical school and received an M.D. at Rush Medical College. He performed psychiatric evaluations of parolees in the Illinois State correctional system, and then worked at various mental health institutions including in Detroit, Seattle, and Indiana.

== Invention of polygraph ==
The instrument, with its diverse collection of physiological indices, became known as the polygraph, which Larson then fully developed for forensic use in 1921, and applied it in police investigations at the Berkeley Police Department. His instrument provided continuous readings of blood pressure, rather than discontinuous readings of the sort found in Marston's device.

On April 19, 1921, the device used in a criminal case for the first time following a string of thefts at an all-girls dorm, College Hall, at the University of California, Berkeley. At the suggestion of police chief August Vollmer, Larson questioned the 90 residents of the house with the polygraph.

In the summer of 1921, the San Francisco Call and Post arranged for Larson to use the apparatus to test William Hightower, accused of murdering a priest in San Francisco. The newspaper reported Larson's findings the following morning: Hightower was pronounced guilty by impartial science. The graphic results of the interrogation were printed large across the page, with arrows marking each presumed lie. Vollmer exalted the machine to the press, which renamed it the 'lie detector.' However, Larson himself used to refer to his apparatus as a 'cardio-pneumo psychogram,' which basically consisted of a modification of an Erlanger Sphygmomanometer.

== Legacy ==
Larson married Margaret Taylor, a freshman victim of the College Hall case at the University of California, Berkeley, who had been the first person he ever interrogated on the lie detector. According to called her back to the lab for more tests and asked her to answer the question, "Do you love me?". The pair married 16 months later. On the day of the wedding, a story about the couple appeared in San Francisco Examiner, and the polygraph results were described as follows: "the wings of the ‘lie detector’ trembled, fluttered, waved a frantic SOS."

Over the next fifteen years, he collected hundreds of files on successful criminal cases where his polygraph solved murders, robberies, thefts and sex crimes. His instrument was nicknamed 'Sphyggy' by the press who covered Larson's crime solving escapades in the 1920s and '30s; Sphyggy because they couldn't pronounce 'Sphygmomanometer.' The polygraph is included in the Encyclopædia Britannica Almanac 2003's list of 325 greatest inventions. This first polygraph instrument of Larson is now at the Smithsonian Institution in Washington, D.C. It first appeared in action in a moving picture in 1926 in the silent police serial ‘’Officer 444’’.

Due to differing methods of using his device that Larson felt were incorrect and abusive by some law enforcement, he eventually came to regret having invented it, writing in 1965:

“Beyond my expectation, thru uncontrollable factors, this scientific investigation became for practical purposes a Frankenstein’s monster, which I have spent over 40 years in combating.”

His contributions to the development of the polygraph are featured in the documentary film The Lie Detector which first aired on American Experience on January 3, 2023.

== Bibliography ==
- The cardio-pneumo-psychogram in deception. Phillips Bros., Print (1924)
- Single fingerprint system, (The Berkeley police monograph series). D. Appleton (1924)
- The use of the polygraph in the study of deception at the Institute of Juvenile Research, Chicago. Dept. of Public Welfare (1927)
- Lying and its detection: A study of deception and deception tests (Behavior research fund. Monographs). The University of Chicago press (1932)
- Truth in the Machine E. Carlson, Cal Alumni Association, UC Berkeley (2010)

== See also ==
- Polygraph
