= Swatting =

Serious fraudulent report to emergency service

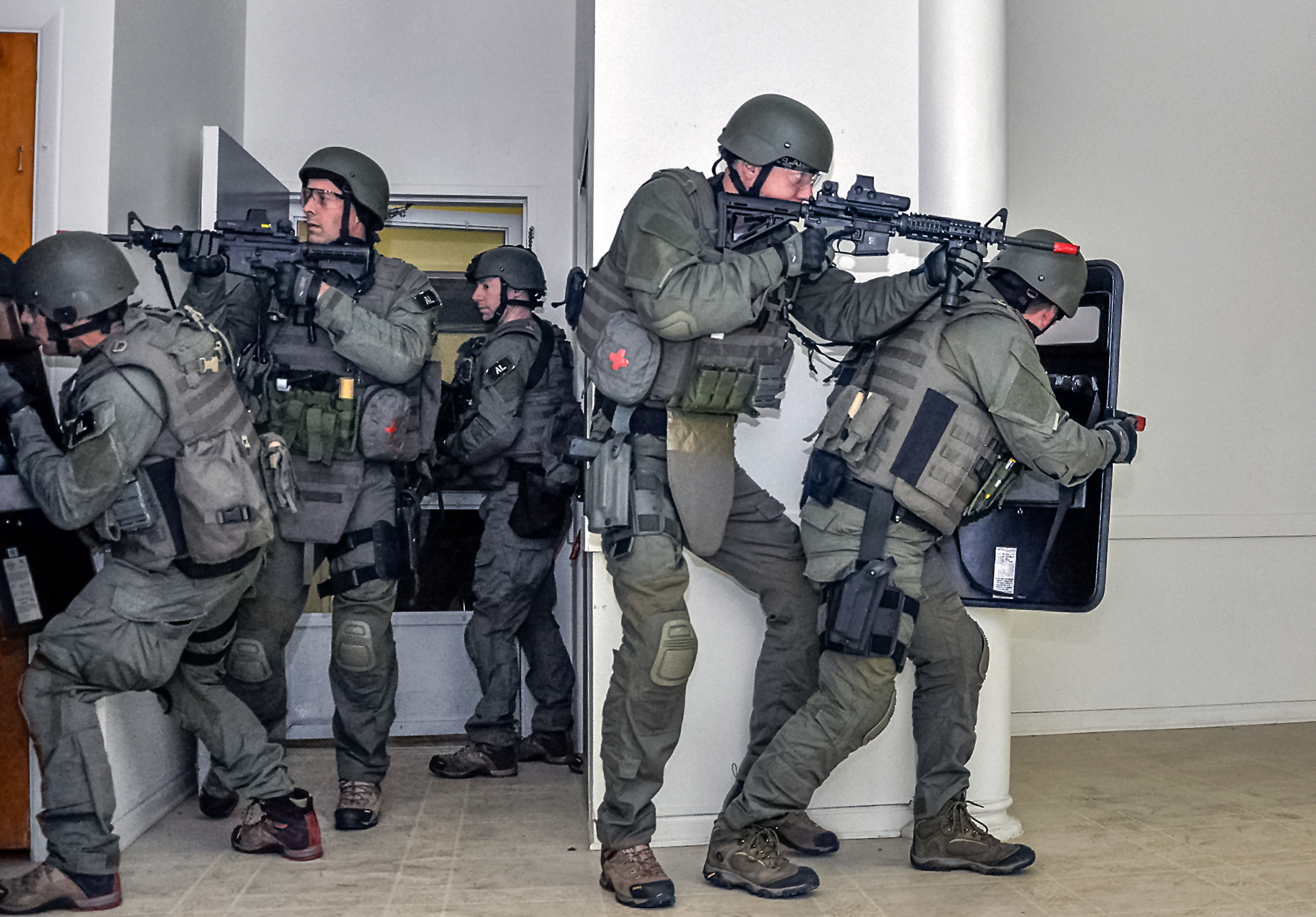
An FBI SWAT team during training. The term is derived from SWAT unit

Swatting is a form of criminal harassment that involves deceiving an emergency service (via such means as hoaxing an emergency services dispatcher) into sending a police or emergency response team to another person's location. This is achieved by false reporting of a serious law enforcement emergency, such as a hostage situation, bomb threat, active shooter, or domestic violence incident, or of a mental health crisis, such as an armed person presenting as suicidal or homicidal.

The term is derived from the law enforcement unit SWAT (Special Weapons and Tactics), a police tactical unit originated in the United States. It is not related to the verb "to swat". SWAT teams are equipped with tactical gear and weapons that differ from patrol units, and are called to situations that are deemed high-risk. A threat may result in evacuations of schools and businesses, property damage, widespread panic, and the potential for copycat callers. Advocates have called for swatting to be considered terrorism due to its use to intimidate and create the risk of injury or death.

Making false reports to emergency services is a criminal offense in many jurisdictions, often punishable by fine or imprisonment. In March 2019, a California man was sentenced to 20 years in prison for carrying out a fatal 2017 swatting. Swatting carries a high risk of violence, and causes resources of about US$10,000 per incident to be wasted by a city or county that responds to a false report of a serious law enforcement emergency, as well as police or municipal liability in cases of violence or use of force. In California, swatters bear the "full cost" of the response, which can lead to fines of up to $10,000 if great bodily injury or death occur as a result of the swatting.

== History ==
Bomb threats were a concern to police in the 1970s, with public buildings such as airports being evacuated in response to hoax calls designed to cause mass panic and public disruption, or to delay exams at educational institutions. In recent decades, hoax callers sometimes use techniques to disguise their identity or country of origin.

Swatting has origins in prank calls to emergency services. Over the years, callers used increasingly sophisticated techniques to direct response units of particular types. In particular, attempts to have SWAT teams be dispatched to particular locations spawned the term swatting. The term was used by the FBI as early as 2008, and entered Oxford Dictionaries Online in 2015.

In 2019 the Anti-Defamation League estimated that there were about 1,000 swatting incidents nationwide, each costing about $10,000 of police time.

== Techniques ==
Caller ID spoofing, social engineering, prank calls, and phone phreaking techniques may be variously combined by swatting perpetrators, along with TTY systems meant for the use of those with hearing disabilities. 911 systems (including computer telephony systems and human operators) have been tricked by calls placed from cities hundreds of miles away from the location of the purported call, or even from other countries. The caller typically places a 911 call using a spoofed phone number, hiding the caller's real location.

Swatting is linked to the action of doxing, which is obtaining and broadcasting, often via the Internet, the address and details of an individual with an intent to harass or endanger them.

== Countermeasures ==
In October 2018, the Seattle Police Department instituted a three-part approach to combating swatting: educating 911 dispatchers to identify fraudulent calls; ensuring that responding officers were aware of the potential for a hoax; and creating an opt-in registry for people who feared that they might become victims of swatting, such as journalists, celebrities, and live streamers. Using the registry, these people can provide cautionary information to the police, to inform officers responding to potential swatting attempts that target the victim's address.

Security reporter Brian Krebs recommends that police departments take extra care when responding to calls received at their non-emergency numbers, or through speech synthesis systems, since these methods are often employed by out-of-area swatters who cannot connect to regional 911 centers.

In September 2019, the Seattle Police Department formed the Swatting Mitigation Advisory Committee, composed of expert community and police representatives. Its purpose is to better understand swatting by collecting and analyzing data, formalizing protocols, and advocating broader awareness and prevention. It is currently co-chaired by Naveed Jamali and Sean Whitcomb, creator of the anti-swatting registry.

In June 2023, the FBI announced that it would create a database to track swattings and improve information-sharing among local police agencies.

== Laws ==
=== United States ===
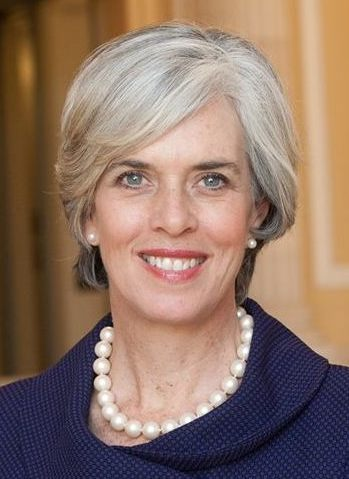
Representative Katherine Clark of Massachusetts, sponsor of the Interstate Swatting Hoax Act of 2015

In the United States, swatting can be prosecuted through federal criminal statutes:

- "Threatening interstate communications"
- "Conspiracy to retaliate against a witness, victim, or informant"
- "Conspiracy to commit access device fraud and unauthorized access of a protected computer"
- An accomplice may be found guilty of "conspiring to obstruct justice"
- In California, callers bear the "full cost" of the response which can range up to $10,000

In 2011, California State Senator Ted Lieu authored a bill to increase penalties for swatting. His own family became a victim of swatting when the bill was proposed. A dozen police officers, along with firefighters and paramedics surrounded his family home.

In 2015, New Jersey State Assemblyman Paul D. Moriarty announced a bill to increase sentences for hoax emergency calls, and was targeted by a hoax. The bill proposed prison sentences up to ten years and fines up to $150,000.

A 2015 bipartisan bill in Congress sponsored by Katherine Clark and Patrick Meehan made swatting a federal crime with increased penalties. Congresswoman Clark wrote an op-ed in The Hill saying that 2.5 million cases of cyberstalking between 2010 and 2013 had only resulted in ten cases prosecuted, although a source for this was not provided. As revenge for the bill, an anonymous caller fraudulently called police to Rep. Clark's house on January 31, 2016.

=== United Kingdom ===
In the United Kingdom, swatting is not recognized as an offence under UK laws unlike the US but may be prosecuted as perverting the course of justice where false complaints or allegations were made.

In 2015, 28-year-old Robert Walker-McDaid pleaded guilty at Warwick Crown Court to perverting the course of justice, and was given a 20 month suspended sentence. Walker-McDaid was also required to complete 200 hours of community service and provide £1000 compensation to Tyran Dobbs, who was the victim of Walker-McDaid's hoax call.

== Injuries or deaths due to swatting ==
=== 2015 Oklahoma incident ===
On January 15, 2015, in Sentinel, Oklahoma, dispatchers received 911 calls from someone identifying himself as Dallas Horton who told dispatchers he had placed a bomb in a local preschool. Washita County sheriff's deputies and the Sentinel police chief Louis Ross made forced entry into Horton's residence. Ross, who was wearing a bulletproof vest, was shot several times by Horton. Ross was treated for his wounds and released from a local hospital. Further investigation revealed that the calls did not originate from the residence, leading Oklahoma State Bureau of Investigation agents to conclude that Horton was unaware it was law enforcement officers entering his home. James Edward Holly confessed to investigators that he made the calls with two "nonfunctioning" phones because he was angry with Horton.

=== 2017 Wichita incident ===
During a December 28, 2017 online dispute between Casey Viner and Shane Gaskill regarding the video game Call of Duty: WWII, Viner threatened to have Gaskill swatted. Gaskill gave Viner his former address, which was a home in Wichita, Kansas, occupied by an uninvolved person, Andrew Finch. Viner then asked Tyler Barriss, an anonymous online swatter, to make the fraudulent call to initiate the swatting. Wichita police responded to the false address, and as Finch exited the house, a police officer fatally shot him.

Barriss pled guilty to involuntary manslaughter and several previous unrelated crimes, and in March 2019, he was sentenced to 20 years in federal prison. Viner was sentenced to 15 months' imprisonment and two years' supervised release for his involvement, while Gaskill was sentenced to 18 months' imprisonment. The officer was not charged.

=== 2020 Tennessee incident ===
On April 27, 2020, Mark Herring, a sixty-year-old man from Bethpage, Tennessee, died of a heart attack after police responded to false reports of a woman being killed at his house. The swatting was part of a scheme to force him to give up his Twitter handle "@tennessee". Shane Sonderman was sentenced to five years in prison for the swatting, and ordered to pay a $250,000 fine. A 16-year-old in the United Kingdom was also involved, but they could not be extradited or identified due to their age as a juvenile.

=== 2026 Tucson incident ===
In late July 2026, 23-year-old Tucson man Axeel Melendez was shot in the hip and spine by Pima County Sheriff's Department deputies after dispatchers received a report of a shooting at the residence. Two days earlier, Melendez had called 911 to report that an alleged hacker had threatened him with swatting and referral to ICE due to his surname. He was reportedly told that he would be notified of any hoax calls involving his address. Melendez was left paralyzed after the police shooting and is currently seeking $176 million in damages.

== Other notable cases ==
=== Video game streamers ===
Due to the popularity of streaming services, many broadcasters have been victim of swatting. Two weeks after the Fortnite World Cup Finals, where 16-year-old Kyle "Bugha" Giersdorf won $3 million and the title of best solo Fortnite player, he was swatted while streaming live on Twitch. Ben "DrLupo" Lupo stated he was swatted three times in one month. Other popular gaming broadcasters have been victims of swatting, including Tyler "Ninja" Blevins.

=== 2013 ===
In 2013, a number of U.S. celebrities were victims of swatting, including Sean Combs (P. Diddy). There were also swatting incidents at the residences of Ashton Kutcher, Tom Cruise, Chris Brown, Miley Cyrus, Iggy Azalea, Jason Derulo, Snoop Dogg, Justin Bieber and Clint Eastwood.

In April 2013 California State Senator Ted Lieu, who was arguing at the time for anti-swatting laws in the state, was himself swatted.

In 2013, a network of fraudsters involved in carding and doxing of public officials using stolen credit reports targeted computer security expert Brian Krebs with malicious police reports. Mir Islam, the group's leader, had also used swatting hoaxes against prosecutor Stephen P. Heymann, congressman Mike Rogers, and a woman he was cyberstalking after she declined his romantic proposals. Islam was convicted of doxing and swatting over 50 public figures, including Michelle Obama, Robert Mueller, John Brennan as well as Krebs, and sentenced to two years in prison. Ukrainian computer hacker Sergey Vovnenko was convicted of trafficking in stolen credit cards, as well as planning to purchase heroin, ship it to Krebs, then swat him. He was sentenced to 15 months in prison in Italy, and 41 months in prison in New Jersey.

=== 2014 ===
Hal Finney, a paralyzed computer scientist with amyotrophic lateral sclerosis (ALS), was swatted in 2014 after refusing to pay a $400,000 ransom. He faced cold, unsafe conditions on his lawn for half an hour while police checked his house. He continued receiving threats until his death in August 2014.

=== 2022 ===
In July 2022, Emmet G. Sullivan, a U.S. federal judge presiding over cases pertaining to the January 6 United States Capitol attack, was the victim of a swatting incident.

On August 5, 2022, Canadian transgender streamer and political commentator Clara "Keffals" Sorrenti was swatted at her home by unknown individuals who also, posing as Sorrenti, sent a threatening email and a photo of an illegal firearm to London city councillors, presumably part of a harassment campaign carried out by Kiwi Farms that began on March 21, 2022. Sorrenti claimed she was repeatedly misgendered and deadnamed by London Police officers, and placed into custody for 11 hours before being released without charges. She stated that she considered the incident a hate crime, an example of harassment towards transgender people by anti-LGBTQ groups in the United States. The London Police Service responded with a statement from Chief of Police Steve Williams, who said that while he could not confirm any language used before Sorrenti's arrest, she was not addressed by her deadname or previous gender while in the agency's holding cells. He also said that any references to Sorrenti's deadname during the investigation seemed to stem from the existence of prior police reports she had accumulated before the event. Three other streamers, Adin Ross, Nadia Amine, and IShowSpeed were also swatted the same week as Sorrenti.

In August 2022, U.S. representative Marjorie Taylor Greene was swatted in Georgia by a caller who allegedly opposed her stances on transgender rights.

=== 2023 ===
In November 2023, Ned Luke, a voice and performance artist for the fictional character Michael De Santa in the video game Grand Theft Auto V, was swatted in his home during a Thanksgiving live-stream of himself playing the game. He took a phone call warning him of the pending police action before he prematurely ended his stream. As of late 2025 he has been swatted eight times in total, with responding police officers becoming so familiar with the situation one simply entered his home, announcing "you're being swatted again" which was captured on a live stream.

In late 2023 and early 2024, a number of prominent American politicians were targeted in a string of swatting attacks. Initially, the attacks appeared directed primarily at conservative Republicans, but members of the Democratic Party were increasingly targeted as well. In August of 2024, two foreign nationals from Serbia and Romania were indicted in connection with the swatting incidents.

Maine Sec. of State Shenna Bellows was targeted with a fake emergency call to police that caused officers to respond to her home the day after she removed former President Donald Trump from Maine's Presidential Primary Ballot under the Constitution's insurrection clause.

== See also ==
- Computer security
- Mobbing
