= Wichita Police Department =

- Abbreviation: WPD

Agency overview
- Employees: 862

Jurisdictional structure
- Operations jurisdiction: Wichita, Kansas, USA
- Map of Wichita Police Department's jurisdiction
- Area: 138.9 square miles (360 km^{2})
- Population: 397,532 (2020)
- General nature: Local civilian police

Operational structure
- Headquarters: 455 N Main Street, Wichita, Kansas
- Agency executive: Joseph Sullivan, Chief of Police

Website
- Wichita Police

The Wichita Police Department (WPD) is the primary law enforcement agency serving Wichita, Kansas. Wichita Police Department’s jurisdiction overlaps with the Sedgwick County Sheriff's office.

== History ==
The Wichita Police Department was created on April 13, 1871. A notable figure in the Department’s history was O.W. Wilson, who was considered an innovative police reformer. Wilson was credited with starting the Criminal Justice Program at Wichita State University, previously called the Municipal University of Wichita in 1937. O.W. Wilson was a protegee of Chief August Vollmer and later became the Superintendent of the Chicago Police Department.

Another well known historical figure was Wyatt Earp, later known for his role in the shootout at the OK Corral. He was hired by then City Marshal Mike Meager as a police officer in Wichita on April 21, 1875 and fired on April 19, 1876. He then moved to Dodge City.

On September 15, 1978, eighty-four (84) members of the police department turned in their badges and identification cards and went on strike to support the Wichita Fire Department, who were already on strike. The FOP cited pay and overtime compensation as the main reason for the strike, along with their inability to obtain a new union contract. Wichita Police Chief Richard LaMunyon fired 84 striking police officers, which grew to 122 officers by the end of the strike. Although the Police Chief said he would not hire the officers back, he eventually rehired most of the officers, but forced them to reapply for their jobs.

In 1977 Chief Richard LaMunyon announced plans to implement Neighborhood Team Policing in Wichita beginning July 1, 1978. In June, 1978 the Police Department's structure was changed to accommodate Team Policing. A Captain commanded 31 officers, six Lieutenants, and detectives who all will work as a team in a geographic area to address crime. In 1983 Chief Richard LaMunyon announced the restructuring of the Department but retained the team concept. The original six (6) patrol sectors were consolidated into four (4) patrol sectors. Chief LaMunyon cited the lack of budget and manpower as a driving force behind the restructuring. Team Policing in its original structure was discontinued.

Chief Richard LaMunyon is nationally known for his role in starting the Law Enforcement Torch Run as part of Special Olympics. The Law Enforcement Torch Run began in 1981 by Chief LaMunyon in the Wichita Police Department and in 1983 the International Association of Chiefs of Police officially adopted the Torch Run. Many of the original participants in the Torch Run were later inducted as Hall of Fame members by Special Olympics.

In the Herman Hill riot of 1979, 88 people were arrested and at least 51 were injured.

In 1993, Deputy Chief Mike Watson proposed the Police Department implement community policing in specific high-crime targeted areas as a precursor to adopting a city-wide implementation strategy. In 1994 two supervisors, Stephen Cole, and Thomas Stolz, were selected to lead the initiative. They selected 15 staff members trained to work with diverse populations, mediate neighborhood disputes, problem-solve, and use community resources. The officers were relieved of 911 call responsibility and focused on developing partnerships with the community while solving neighborhood problems. In March 1996, the Police Department expanded community policing to cover the entire city and assigned 36 officers, each assigned to a beat, to community policing.

In 1996 the Wichita Police Department received the Webber Seavey Excellence in Law Enforcement Award presented by the International Association of Chiefs of Police for a community project aimed at reducing prostitution in South Central Wichita. Traditional law enforcement activities such as prostitution stings only provided short-term relief to the community. In 1994 the Wichita Police Department adopted and implemented a philosophy of community policing in four targeted high-crime neighborhoods, which included the South Central neighborhood. The Wichita Police Department addressed the crime issues using a strategic enforcement plan and proposed two new city ordinances to combat crime in the area. An evaluation of the South Central Prostitution Project indicated that crime decreased in the area. Weapon violations and prostitution offenses declined dramatically. The neighborhood recorded an 11 percent decrease in crime for 1995 compared to 1994, with even more significant decreases observed in property crimes.

In 2001 the Wichita Police Department received recognition as a top 30 semifinalist for the Webber Seavey Excellence in Law Enforcement Award from the International Association of Chiefs. The Police Department restructured the Investigations Division to transition the Investigations Division to Community Policing. Results from the project indicate that clearance rates for homicide improved, and three cold cases were also solved during the year. Robbery clearances improved from 39% to 48%, aggravated assault clearances improved 11 percent, and rape clearance skyrocketed from 78% to 98%. Overall violent crime clearance rates improved from 52% to 60% between 1998 and 1999.

In 2003 the Wichita Police Department again received national recognition by receiving the Webber Seavey Award for Best Policing project in 2002 for a midsized City. The Police Department was recognized for the Plainview Project, which addressed juvenile crime. Officers organized a soccer league and a summer camp for children from kindergarten through 8th grade. Juvenile crime, including auto theft and vandalism, fell 32 percent from 2001 to 2002.

The WPD made national news for the killing spree of Dennis Rader, also known as the BTK serial killer, from 1974 to 1978. He was arrested and convicted in 2005. A tissue sample from his daughter was used to confirm DNA tests that linked Rader to ten killings committed between 1974 and 1991. Homicide Unit Commander Ken Landwehr was the department's expert on the BTK killer case, so the Wichita Police Department's Chief of Police Norman D. Williams assigned Landwehr to head the BTK Task Force in 2004.

The Wichita Police Department, in conjunction with the Kansas Bureau of Investigation, filed the very first Federal Racketeering case in Kansas history on September 28, 2007. Two indictments name 28 defendants - all Crips Gang members - citing 4 murders, 11 attempted murders, and other crimes including arson, robbery, cocaine, and crack cocaine possession with intent to distribute and transportation of minors to engage in prostitution. According to the indictment, the Crips formed a criminal enterprise engaging in illegal activities including narcotics trafficking, drive-by shootings, and burglaries; sought to preserve and expand their power through intimidation, threats and assaults; attempted to preserve and protect themselves from interference by law enforcement; and tried to keep their victims in fear through violence and threats.

The 2017 Wichita swatting that resulted in Wichita resident Andrew Finch being fatally shot by WPD Officer Justin Rapp.

In 2021 and 2022, the WPD received national attention for its lack of action in handling racism and extremism on the force. Department managers failed to appropriately discipline Wichita Police Department members who exchanged racist, sexist and homophobic texts and images. A city report stated the police force mismanaged investigation of the incidents. A committee appointed by Wichita City Manager Robert Layton said the department must "crack down on biased police officers, poor leadership, botched investigations and poor oversight."

Also in 2021, Chief Lemuel Moore received national attention for disciplining members of the department who had sent extremist and racist messages. Moore has criticized an investigation under his predecessor, Gordon Ramsay, that cleared most of the officers of any wrongdoing in racist messaging and ordered “non-discipline” coaching and mentoring for some of the most egregious messages. An outside organization will be hired to conduct an investigation into the extent of racism and extremism in the police force.

=== List of Chiefs ===
- William C. Smith (1871)
- Michael M. Meager (1871–1874)
- William C. Smith (1874–1875)
- Michael M. Meager (1875–1877)
- Richard Cogdell (1877–1878)
- Daniel F. Parks (1878–1879)
- James Cairns (1879–1887)
- Williams W. Haines (1887–1888)
- Lewis Aspey (1889)
- James Cairns (1889–1890)
- Charles E. Burrows (1890–1893)
- Rufus Cone (1893–1895)
- O. Park Massey (1895)
- Charles E. Burrows (1895)
- Frank S. Burt (1895–1897)
- William Campbell (1897–1899)
- Charles M. Jones (1899)
- George T. Cubbon (1899–1902)
- Frank S. Burt (1902–1905)
- George T. Cubbon (1905–1907)
- Bedford Wood (1907–1908)
- Orman C. Emery (1908–1909)
- Frank S. Burt (1909–1910)
- James H. McPherson (1910–1911)
- William Henry Boston (1911)
- Lincoln McKinley (1911)
- S. S. Meanor (1911)
- George T. Cubbon (1911–1913)
- G. C. Kensler (1913–1915)
- O. K. Stewart (1915)
- G. C. Hay (1915–1919)
- Samuel W. Zickefoose (1919–1921)
- Thomas F. Dawkins (1921)
- W. A. Scott (1921–1924)
- T. J. Thompson (1924–1926)
- I. B. Walston (1926–1928)
- O. W. Wilson (1928–1939)
- Leroy E. Bowery (1939–1941)
- Clyde Wilder (1941)
- Thomas H. Jaycox (1941–1946)
- George W. Shepherd (1946–1952)
- Roland Price (1952–1957)
- R. L. Anderson (1957)
- Eugene M. Pond (1957–1968)
- Merrill R. Kirkpatrick (1968–1972)
- Floyd R. Hannon, Jr. (1972–1976)
- Richard E. LaMunyon (1976–1988)
- Kerry D. Crisp (1988–1989)
- Floyd D. Powell (1989)
- Rick Stone (1989–1995)
- William M. Watson (1995–1999)
- John E. Hershberger (1999–2000)
- Norman D. Williams (2000–2014)
- Nelson L. Mosley (2014–2016)
- Gordon Ramsay (2016–2022)
- Lemuel Moore (2022–09/2022)
- Troy Livingston (Interim 09/2022-12/2022)
- Joseph "Joe" Sullivan (11/2022-Present)

== Demographics ==
As of 2000, the WPD had the following demographic profile:

- Male: 89%
- Female: 11%
- White: 82%
- African-American/Black: 9%
- Hispanic: 5%
- Other: 3%

== Awards ==
In 1991, Chief Rick Stone was named "Law Enforcement Officer of the Year" by the United States Marshals Service.

In 1996 the Wichita Police Department received the Webber Seavey Excellence in Law Enforcement Award for the South Central Prostitution Project.

In 2003, the International Association of Chiefs of Police awarded the department the "Webber Seavey Excellence in Law Enforcement Award" for a project addressing violent crime in the Planeview neighborhood of Wichita.

Also in 2003, the Boy Scouts of America gave the department the "Whitney Young Jr Community Service Award" for their support of Camp Awareness, a local four-day camp for boys between the ages of 7 and 10.

== See also ==
- 2017 Wichita swatting
- List of law enforcement agencies in Kansas
