= Herman Hill riot =

Riot in Wichita, Kansas, United States

Coordinates: 37°38′56″N 97°20′19″W

The 1979 Easter Sunday Herman Hill riot in Wichita, Kansas, United States – a confrontation between 500 law-enforcement personnel (from Wichita and surrounding jurisdictions) and the 3,500 attendees at a rock concert in Herman Hill Park – was one of the largest riots in the history of Wichita, drawing national attention and creating political and legal controversy.

The event resulted in over 50 injuries, to more than two dozen police officers and dozens of civilians, and over 80 arrests. Tear gas was used and firearms were discharged. The event triggered extensive local, state and national attention, including investigations by authorities at all those levels, and raised major questions about the conduct of law enforcement in the Wichita area.

== Details ==
The Herman Hill riot was a riot that took place in Wichita, Kansas, between the audience at the rock concert of local band Roenarc in Herman Hill Park and the police on April 15, 1979 (Easter Sunday). Reports stated that 53 people were injured during the riot.

The concert began in an undeveloped park on the southern edge of the city purportedly capable of holding 1,500 people; later crowd estimates ranged between 3,500 and 5,000 people, but attendees estimated the number to be closer to 1,000.

Police responded to complaints about loud noise and drug use. As news of the concert spread, motorcycles, along with some cars and pick-up trucks, began illegally parking on a section of grass that had previously been used as an overflow parking area. The conflict began when police ordered people to remove these vehicles from the grass. Tensions escalated after officers who responded to the complaints saw an individual dispensing beer from the back of a pick-up truck. A combination of the people's refusal to disperse, the confrontation with the owner of the pick-up, and the fact that the officers were greatly outnumbered caused the officers to call for reinforcements. The second wave of police launched tear gas canisters into the crowd. Many children were present and were overcome with the gas. In retaliation, some in the crowd began throwing rocks and bottles. A police car was overturned. In panic, many of the concert-goers fled into the surrounding residential area and were sheltered for several hours by local residents.

As a result of the riot, 62 adults and 22 juveniles were taken into custody. Reports stated that 22 citizens and 31 police officers were injured during the riot. Many local law enforcement agencies attended, including the Kansas Highway Patrol, Sheriff's Offices and Police Departments of nearby towns (including Arkansas City, Colwich, Goddard, Derby and Haysville). Representatives of a total of 22 different law enforcement groups were present on the scene. Reports cited damage of around $10,000. At least two citizens were shot at.

There was public outcry against the police's handling of the riot. There were no lasting injuries among officers, and police were not found to have broken any laws. In an interview, the city's police chief denied that brutality was used in quelling the riot. After the statement, a video tape was shown in which police hit civilians with batons.

In the years following the riot incident, Herman Hill Park has evolved into a neighborhood-centered and family-friendly destination. The City of Wichita established a police substation in the northeast corner of the park. In 2003, the Water Center, a groundwater remediation facility and interactive museum, opened to the public. Paved trails allow visitors to walk alongside a creek, view an aquarium of native fish, and watch the Arkansas River as it flows out of the city.

This event inspired a song by Manilla Road, "Herman Hill", released in 1979.
