= Silent Talker Lie Detector =

Camera added to a polygraph

The Silent Talker Lie Detector is an attempt to increase the accuracy of the most common lie detector, the polygraph, which does not directly measure whether the subject is truthful, but records physiological measures that are associated with emotional responses. The Silent Talker gives the evaluator access to viewing microexpressions by adding a camera to the process. The creators claim that microexpressions are actual indicators of lying, while many other things could cause an emotional response. Since microexpressions are fleeting, the camera allows the examiner to capture data that otherwise would have been missed. However, the scientific community is not convinced that this system accomplishes what it claims and some call it pseudoscience.

== Functionality ==
The Silent Talker is a camera system which observes and analyzes nonverbal communication in the form of microexpression while a subject is being interviewed, and is marketed as a tool for credibility assessment. Silent Talker was invented between 2000 and 2002 by a team at Manchester Metropolitan University. The system claims to avoid numerous problems with previous lie detection devices by using an artificial neural network.

Polygraphs are used under the hypothesis that most people do not lie or deceive without some feelings of anxiety or nervousness. This stems from the idea that most people either feel bad that they are lying or are afraid that they will get caught or will be in trouble if they lie. It is this fear and guilt that produces the anxiety and nervousness. When a person feels this way they exhibit difficult to detect involuntary physiological changes that can be detected with a polygraph. Most polygraph examiners will say that they do not test specifically for lies, but for these deceptive reactions. The Silent Talker camera allows the examiner to add microexpressions that may be more directly associated with actual lying. And, since microexpressions are more difficult for the subject to control, theoretically they could provide the examiner with better data.

Polygraph examination results are not generally court admissible because they are considered fundamentally unreliable and there is a fear that jurors would, without question, believe all results of a polygraph."

== Unreliability ==
In a Psychology Today article, Arash Emamzadeh writes that while there are no easy ways to detect lying, the cognitive approach may increase accuracy. Other sources give advice about what techniques people usually use to determine if a speaker is being truthful. These articles focus on non-verbal behavior of the speaker with an emphasis on unconscious behaviors.

Microexpressions are an example of body language that is both often unconscious and not usually something that the examiner would be able to notice. The Silent Talker system adds a camera to the usual polygraph to catch these microexpressions so that they can be analyzed as part of the analysis of the truthfulness of the speaker. Ekman explains that "micro expressions are facial expressions that occur within a fraction of a second. This involuntary emotional leakage exposes a person's true emotions." However, the evidence doesn't show that this device actually makes a difference in the interpretation of the results.

== Scientific and legal criticism ==
A 2019 article for The Intercept stated that "some academics are questioning the value of the system, which they say relies on pseudoscience to make its decisions about travelers’ honesty," and that "The technology is based on a fundamental misunderstanding of what humans do when being truthful and deceptive."

The Guardian reports that the accuracy of polygraph results from 57 studies was "far from satisfactory." There are many examples of how the devices do not work because the physiological response being measured may be a result of the stress of the situation or conversely the actually guilty person may not experience these reactions. In one example, there was an effective detector of actual lies. It was a photocopier that spat out preprinted pages saying "He's lying" that was able to elicit confessions when the guilty person believed the system worked.

In a detailed review of the history and research involving the Silent Talker and other polygraph results, Jake Bittle has written that there is danger in using a technical device to ascertain whether a psychological process is being correctly evaluated. This danger can be amplified if the device is able to make more human-like conclusions as is the case with AI. There are many anecdotes about failures of the system which has never been able to achieve better than an 80% rate of success.

Since the test results can easily be incorrect, they are rarely admissible in court. If the lawyers wish to have the results included in a trial, the U.S. Supreme Court has issued standards for admissibility of scientific tests that must be submitted before a judge makes the decision. However the polygraph is commonly used in police investigations.

An analysis of the use of the silent talker being used for border crossings was completed by The Intercept. They concluded that this system is not only cumbersome and expensive but gave a false report that a traveler was lying when that was not actually the case. This example clearly shows the dangers of using this system, including that it may be used to deny entry to travelers who are incorrectly deemed to be untruthful.
