= Employee Polygraph Protection Act =

US federal law

Employee Polygraph Protection Act of 1988
- Long title: An Act to prevent the denial of employment opportunities by prohibiting the use of lie detectors by employers involved in or affecting interstate commerce.
- Enacted by: the 100th United States Congress

Citations
- Public law: Pub. L. 100–347
- Statutes at Large: 102 Stat. 646

Legislative history
- Introduced in the House as H.R. 1212 by Pat Williams on February 24, 1987; Committee consideration by Education and Labor; Passed the House on November 4, 1987 (254–158); Passed the Senate on March 3, 1988 (69–27) with amendment; House agreed to Senate amendment on June 1, 1988 (251–120) with further amendment; Senate agreed to House amendment on June 9, 1988 (Voice vote); Signed into law by President Ronald Reagan on June 27, 1988

The Employee Polygraph Protection Act of 1988 (EPPA) is a United States federal law that generally prevents employers from using polygraph (lie detector) tests, either for pre-employment screening or during the course of employment, with certain exemptions.

According to testimony given in the United States Senate, before the law was adopted, some 400,000 workers were annually suffering adverse consequences after being wrongly flunked on polygraphs.

Under EPPA, most private employers may not require or request any employee or job applicant to take a lie detector test, or discharge, discipline, or discriminate against anybody for refusing to take a test or for exercising other rights under the act. However, the act does permit polygraph tests to be administered to certain applicants for job with security firms (such as armored car, alarm, and guard companies) and of pharmaceutical manufacturers, distributors, and dispensers. The law does not cover federal, state, and local government agencies.

In addition, employers are required to display a poster in the workplace explaining the EPPA for their employees.
