= Naveed Jamali =

American national security commentator

Naveed Alexis Jamali
- Born: Naveed A. Jamali; February 20, 1976 (age 50)
- Education: New York University (BA, 1999)
- Notable work: How to Catch a Russian Spy
- Spouse: Ava Brent-Jamali

Naveed Alexis Jamali (Sindhi: نويد جمالي) is an American commentator on national security and a former FBI asset. He worked for the U.S. Department of Defense as an intelligence officer in the United States Navy Reserve. He is the author of the non-fiction book How to Catch a Russian Spy. He also co-chairs the Swatting Mitigation Advisory Committee for the Seattle Police Department.

== Biography ==
Jamali was born to a French mother and a Pakistani Sindhi father who met while attending graduate school in New York. They later opened a research procurement agency in New York City, Fascient Books, Inc., which specialized in finding academic and open-source material. Starting in 1988, they cooperated with the FBI, which was interested in Soviet (and later Russian) intelligence agents after they came into their office requesting to do business.

Jamali graduated from New York University (1999) with a degree in Political Science and Government. After 9/11, he contacted the FBI to offer his services as his parents were nearing retirement. He later became a double agent when a Russian GRU member named Oleg Kulikov attempted to recruit him. The ruse lasted from 2005 to 2009. During this time, Kulikov paid Jamali for what he thought were classified documents. The operation ended with Jamali being "arrested" by the FBI in front of Kulikov, blowing Kulikov's cover as a diplomat in the United States.

Following the operation, Jamali was sworn in to the United States Navy Reserve as an intelligence officer.

Since then, he has become a contributor to MSNBC and a senior fellow at the Foreign Policy Research Institute, an American think tank.

In 2015, Jamali and Ellis Henican co-wrote a book, How to Catch a Russian Spy: The True Story of an American Civilian Turned Double Agent. 20th Century Fox purchased the film rights for the book; it was announced that Mark Heyman will write the screenplay with Marc Webb directing.

On November 27, 2018, Jamali announced a run for the Seattle City Council, representing District 7, after the incumbent, Sally Bagshaw, announced her retirement. He lost the primary, garnering 3% of the vote.

=== Reporting ===
In 2019, Jamali joined Newsweek; first as a columnist, then as an editor-at-large. He has reported extensively on matters of National Security and Intelligence and was part of the team that broke the Abu Bakr al-Baghdadi raid.
