= 2017 Wichita swatting =

Manslaughter in Wichita, Kansas

- Photo of Andrew Thomas Finch, the man killed by police in the swatting.
- Location: Wichita, Kansas, United States
- Date: December 28, 2017; 8 years ago
- Target: Shane Gaskill
- Attack type: Shooting, manslaughter, swatting
- Victim: Andrew Thomas Finch
- Perpetrators: Tyler Rai Barriss (911 caller); Casey S. Viner (contacted Barriss); Shane Gaskill (gave the address to Viner)
- Motive: Revenge swatting due to a disagreement in the video game Call of Duty: WWII (Viner and Gaskill); Thrill seeking, infamy (Barriss)
- Verdict: Pleaded guilty
- Convictions: Barriss: Involuntary manslaughter; False information and hoaxes; Cyberstalking resulting in death; Making threats of death or damage to property by fire; Interstate threat; Conspiracy to make false reports; Viner: Conspiracy to make false/hoax reports; Obstruction of justice; Conspiracy to obstruct justice; Barriss, Viner, and Gaskill: Wire fraud
- Sentence: Barriss; 20 years in prison (parole possible after 17 years and 1 month) plus $10,100 fine and 5 years of supervised release Viner; 15 months in prison plus 2 years of supervised release Gaskill; 18 months in prison

On December 28, 2017, a fatal swatting incident occurred in Wichita, Kansas, United States. During an online dispute between Casey Viner and Shane Gaskill regarding the video game Call of Duty: WWII, Viner threatened to have Gaskill swatted. Gaskill gave Viner a false Wichita address for his residence, one that was occupied by an uninvolved person, Andrew Finch. Viner then asked Tyler Barriss, an anonymous online swatter, to make a fraudulent call to initiate the swatting. The Wichita Police Department responded to the address, and as Finch exited the house, police officer Justin Rapp fatally shot him.

Barriss pleaded guilty to involuntary manslaughter and several previous unrelated crimes, and in March 2019, he was sentenced to 20 years in federal prison. Viner was sentenced to 15 months' imprisonment and two years' supervised release for his involvement, while Gaskill was sentenced to 18 months' imprisonment. Rapp was not charged for Finch's death.

== Background ==
=== Tyler Barriss ===
At the time of the incident, Tyler Rai Barriss was a 25-year-old homeless man living in Los Angeles, California. Known online as "SWAuTistic", he had a criminal record including domestic violence, and had served 16 months in Los Angeles County Jail for making false bomb threats against KABC-TV, an elementary school in Los Angeles, and a middle school in Granada Hills. He was wanted by police in Panama City, Florida, for calling approximately 30 other bomb threats, including one to a high school, and on fraud and mischief charges in Canada for harassing a woman in Calgary.

=== Events of December 28 ===
Reports surfaced that the series of events began with an online argument over a $1.50 wager in an online match of Call of Duty: WWII on UMG Gaming, which operates online video game tournaments. Two men, Casey Viner (known by the pseudonym Baperizer) and Shane Gaskill (known by pseudonym Miruhcle), fought over friendly fire in the match, causing them to lose both the match and $1.50 in wagers. The two gamers took to Twitter in an argument about the loss.

Viner threatened to swat Gaskill over the loss. Gaskill intentionally gave Viner the wrong address, a location in Wichita where he previously resided with his family, and where he said he would "be waiting". Gaskill's family had been evicted from the address in 2016. Viner then contacted Barriss and provided him with the address given to swat Gaskill. Andrew Finch, the resident of the given address, was not a known gamer and had nothing to do with the Call of Duty match.

Using voice over IP through the free Wi-Fi provided by a South Los Angeles library, Barriss called the Wichita Police Department. Because the call was transferred from Wichita City Hall to 911, the dispatcher believed the call was coming from the Wichita area. Barriss, identifying himself as "Brian", claimed that he was at the residence at 1033 West McCormick Street, had fatally shot his father, and was holding family members at gunpoint. He asked if police were coming to the house, saying he had already poured gasoline all over the house and was threatening to set it on fire.

== Shooting ==
Wichita Police Department officers, who were not SWAT team members and were not trained for tactical situations or hostage rescues, responded to Barriss' call and surrounded Finch's residence. Andrew Finch's mother Lisa Finch is reported to have seen the police lights outside and opened the front door to see what was happening. Mrs. Finch reports that her son "screamed and then they shot him." The police report indicates that after Finch stepped onto his front porch, police ordered him to put his hands up. According to officer testimony, he began to do so and then stopped. A Wichita police officer standing on the other side of the street fired a single round, striking Finch and piercing his heart and right lung. Finch was transported to Ascension Via Christi St. Francis, where he was pronounced dead 17 minutes after he was shot.

Finch's mother reports that shortly after the altercation police ordered her and other family members to exit the residence. The family was handcuffed and taken to the police station for questioning. Initial reports from Deputy Wichita Police Chief Troy Livingston stated that "a male came to the front door. As he came to the front door, one of our officers discharged his weapon." Livingston did not initially state if Finch was armed, or what caused the officer to fire his weapon. In a later statement on December 30, the Wichita Police Department stated the shooting was caused by Finch "reaching into his waistband". The officer involved was eventually identified as Justin Rapp, a seven-year veteran of the force.

During a May 2018 court appearance, Rapp testified that he was given no information when he arrived at the scene, including when Finch was given his first verbal command, when the 911 call ended, or whether officers at the scene were aware the caller was still on the phone with 911. Sedgwick County Department of Emergency Communications also denied an open-records request pertaining to the 911 call, stating the police department had asked that no more records be released.

== Aftermath ==
Many Wichita residents and other U.S.-based commentators expressed concern over the death of Finch. Wichita residents used the opportunity of a city council meeting on January 9, 2018 to voice concerns on the subject, including questioning the release of only seven seconds of the police body cam footage, and arguing that the city should assume full responsibility to avoid a lengthy struggle by the Finch family for justice. The council did not comment directly, but indicated a willingness to consider training procedures at a later time.

Nearly a week after the shooting, Andrew Finch's mother Lisa Finch wrote to the Wichita mayor and police chief, stating that she did not know where her son's body was being kept, and that she wanted to give him a "proper funeral service and burial." In the same letter, Mrs. Finch asked why the police officer who killed her son had not, at that time, been identified, why the family had been handcuffed, and when police would return their belongings, including two cell phones and a computer, seized from the house. The family attorney, Andrew M. Stroth, also called for the city, police department, and officer involved in the shooting to be held liable "for the unjustified shooting of Andrew Finch."

Finch's 18-year-old niece, Adelina Finch, died by suicide by gunshot on January 11, 2019. Adelina was raised by Lisa and Andrew Finch after her own mother had died; she was 17 at the time of the shooting, and witnessed her uncle's death. Lisa Finch blamed Adelina's death on the events of December 28, 2017.

Officer Rapp was promoted to detective on June 25, 2022. The promotion was criticized by the Wichita mayor and city council members, as well as Finch's family.

== Parties involved ==
=== Shooting victim ===
- Andrew Thomas Finch, aged 28; father of two, who had no affiliation with either the three men nor played the Call of Duty game.

=== Call of Duty: WWII players ===
- Casey "Baperizer" Viner, 18; of North College Hill, Ohio (sentenced to 15 months in prison and 2 years' supervised release)
- Shane "Miruhcle" Gaskill, 19; of Wichita, Kansas (sentenced to 18 months in prison)

=== 911 hoax caller ===
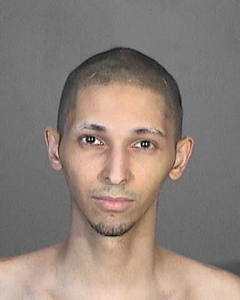
Tyler Barriss

- Tyler Rai "SWAuTistic" Barriss, 25; of Los Angeles, California (sentenced to 20 years in federal prison)

=== Officer who fatally shot Finch ===
- Justin Rapp, Officer, Wichita Police Department; positioned across the street with a rifle, testified that he shot Finch because he believed Finch had a gun and Finch's behavior and hand motions made Rapp believe that Finch was about to open fire on other officers. Rapp was not charged with any crime and was later promoted.

== Legal proceedings ==
Barriss was arrested on December 29, 2017, in Los Angeles on a fugitive warrant stemming from a 2015 charge of making false bomb threats to KABC-TV, and was charged with false alarm, a felony. On January 12, 2018, Barriss was extradited to Kansas, where he was charged with involuntary manslaughter and held in Sedgwick County Jail.

Barriss, Viner, and Gaskill were indicted in the United States District Court for the District of Kansas on May 23, 2018 on charges related to the swatting. Barriss was charged with false information and hoaxes, cyberstalking resulting in death, making threats of death or damage to property by fire, interstate threats, conspiracy to make false reports, and wire fraud. Viner was charged with wire fraud, conspiracy to make false/hoax reports, obstruction of justice, and conspiracy to obstruct justice. Gaskill was charged with obstruction of justice, wire fraud, and conspiracy to obstruct justice. Gaskill was re-indicted in July on additional charges, after it was discovered that he goaded Barriss to "try again" after the fatal shooting. Firearms were forbidden in each household as part of the agreement with the exception of Viner’s father, a law enforcement officer.

On October 26, 2018, forty-six additional charges against Barriss were added, which included financial fraud, and fake threats of bombs and shootings made to police and schools; some of these charges involved unindicted co-conspirators residing in Des Plaines, Illinois; Gulf Breeze, Florida; Grand Rapids, Michigan; and Greenwood, Missouri. On November 13 he pleaded guilty to 51 federal charges, for which U.S. Attorney Stephen McAllister recommended a sentence of 20 years' incarceration. Under the terms of the plea agreement, Barriss was also required to formally apologize to Finch's family and pay $10,100 in fines and restitution, and agreed to five years of supervised release.

Barriss' sentencing was held March 29, 2019; he received 90 months' imprisonment for the California charges, and 150 months for the Kansas charges, to be served consecutively. Barriss also paid a $5,000 fine, the full amount of which was awarded by the Kansas Crime Victims Compensation Board to Finch's family as restitution. He is scheduled to be released from FCI Mendota in 2035.

In April 2019, Viner pleaded guilty to conspiracy and obstruction of justice, and was sentenced in September to a 15-month prison sentence in addition to two years' probation, during which time he would be banned from playing video games. Viner was released from custody at USP Big Sandy on November 14, 2020.

In September 2019, it was reported that Gaskill struck a deal for deferred prosecution that could allow the charges against him to be dropped. Under terms of Gaskill's pretrial diversion agreement, the government agreed not to pursue prosecution for at least 18 months. Gaskill agreed to waive any speedy trial defenses and pay $1,000 in restitution, costs and penalties. In September 2021, it was reported that Gaskill had violated the terms of his pretrial diversion and the trial against him resumed. Gaskill pleaded guilty to one count of wire fraud in May 2022, and was sentenced to 18 months in prison in September 2022.

In July 2022, the U.S. Court of Appeals for the 10th Circuit upheld a ruling by a lower federal court in Kansas, allowing Finch’s family to continue its lawsuit against Rapp but not against the city of Wichita. In March 2023, the city approved $5 million to settle the case. Although the city had been dismissed as a defendant, it was still liable for Rapp's legal costs. The city paid $2 million directly, and the remaining $3 million came from its insurer, AIG.

=== Legislative response ===
In response to Finch's death, the Kansas state legislature approved a bill in March 2018 to establish creating a false alarm resulting in injury or death as a class-one felony, carrying a prison sentence between 10 and 41 years. The bill was signed into law by Governor Jeff Colyer on April 12.

The Andrew T. Finch Memorial Act of 2018 was introduced in the U.S. House of Representatives by Rep. Ron Estes in March 2018. The bill, also known as the Preventing Swatting and Protecting Our Communities Act of 2018, would make providing false information with the intent to cause an emergency response punishable by up to five years' imprisonment, up to 20 years' imprisonment if serious injury results, and up to life imprisonment if the act results in death. The bill was referred to the House Subcommittee on Crime, Terrorism, Homeland Security, and Investigations, but was never taken up for a vote and died in committee.

Rep. Eliot Engel introduced a bill in January 2019 to amend the Communications Act of 1934, to provide for enhanced penalties for the transmission of misleading or inaccurate caller identification information with the intent to trigger an emergency response. As of March 2019, it had been referred to the Subcommittee on Crime, Terrorism, and Homeland Security.

== See also ==
- 2020 Tennessee swatting
