= Berkeley Police Department =

Police department serving Berkeley, California

Coordinates: 37°52′11.73″N 122°16′22.71″W

Agency overview
- Formed: 1909; 117 years ago

Jurisdictional structure
- Operations jurisdiction: United States
- Legal jurisdiction: Municipal
- General nature: Local civilian police

Operational structure
- Headquarters: Berkeley, CA
- Sworn members: 176 authorized
- Unsworn members: 110
- Agency executive: Jen Louis, Chief of Police

Facilities
- Stations: 1

Website
- Official website

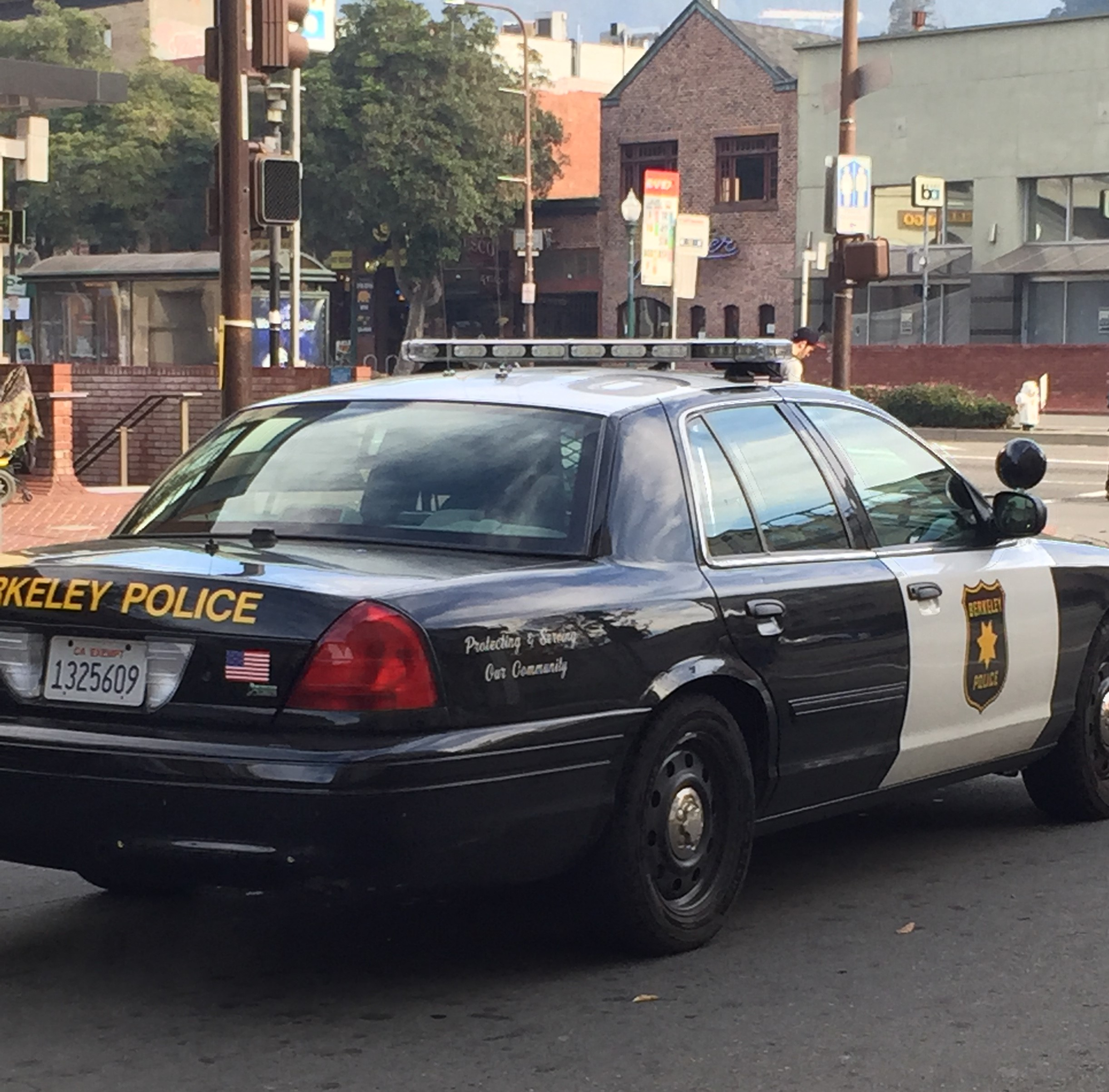
Berkeley Police Department cruiser

The Berkeley Police Department (BPD) is the municipal police department for the city of Berkeley, California, United States.

== History ==
Shortly after Berkeley was incorporated in 1878, a town marshal and constables were elected to provide law enforcement. August Vollmer had been the town marshal since 1905, and was appointed to be the first chief of police in 1909. He remained chief until he retired in 1932, although he left from 1923 to 1924 when briefly appointed the chief of the Los Angeles Police Department.

On May 15, 1969, at the request of Berkeley mayor Wallace J.S. Johnson, Governor Ronald Reagan ordered the Berkeley PD and California Highway Patrol to clear People's Park, at the time a vacant lot that local left-wing activists had been turning into a garden. This prompted the "Bloody Thursday" riots.

In 2012, the Department provoked controversy when Chief Meehan ordered a plainclothes officer to the home of journalist Doug Oakley at 12:45 a.m. to request he make changes to a story. After this was widely condemned as potential intimidation, Chief Meehan apologized. Another controversy arose over Chief Meehan's conduct when in 2010 he solicited a $500,000 housing loan from the public funds to purchase an expensive house in Berkeley, at 3% interest, below market rate. City Council member Lawrence Capitelli, who voted in support of the loan, later became Chief Meehan's real estate agent on the house purchase. On September 20, 2016, Meehan abruptly resigned his post. He gave no reason for the resignation, but the local newspaper Berkeleyside had previously reported on dissatisfaction and low morale among BPD officers. Captain Andrew Greenwood was made acting chief.

The Berkeley PD responded to the 2017 Berkeley protests violently. Ahead of a speech by Ben Shapiro on September 14, Berkeley City Council authorized the police to use pepper spray, which had been previously banned in Berkeley for twenty years.

=== Timeline ===
The following is a list of important events in the department's history, as provided on the department's website:

- 1906 — Installed a basic records system, which was one of the first in the United States.
- 1906 — Installed the first Modus Operandi (MO) System
- 1907 — First use of forensic science in the "Kelinschmidt case" (analysis of blood, fibers and soil)
- 1907 — Department's police school was established. It included instruction from professors on such subjects as the law and evidence procedures. This was the first school of its kind in the world and had a far reaching effect on law enforcement.
- 1911 — Organized the first Police Motorcycle Patrol
- 1913 — Changed to automobiles for patrolling
- 1916 — Chief Vollmer established the first School of Criminology at University of California, Berkeley and was a strong advocate of college-educated police officers.
- 1918 — Began using intelligence tests in recruiting police officers
- 1920 — First lie detector instrument was developed at University of California, Berkeley by John A. Larson and used by BPD
- 1921 — Began using a psychiatric screening in recruitment
- 1923 — First Junior Traffic Police Program was established
- 1924 — Established one of the first single fingerprint systems
- 1925 — Established the department's first Crime Prevention Division and hired the department's first female police officer

== See also ==
- Kelvin Gibbs
