= August Vollmer =

American police chief (1876–1955)

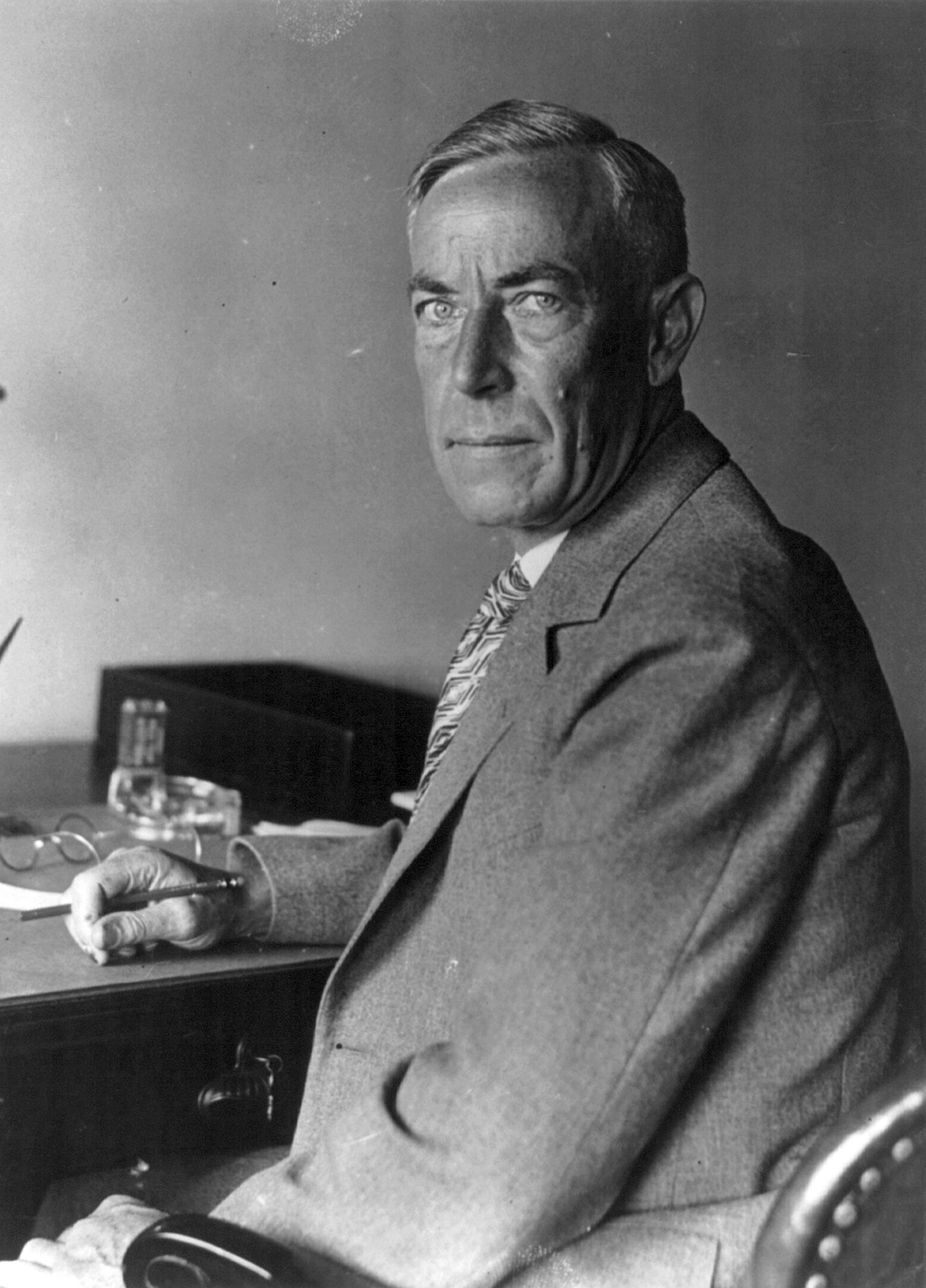
- Vollmer in 1929
- Born: March 7, 1876; New Orleans, Louisiana, U.S.
- Died: November 4, 1955 (aged 79); Berkeley, California, U.S.
- Police career
- Country: United States
- Department: Berkeley Police Department
- Rank: Chief of Police 1909–1923
- Police career
- Country: United States
- Department: Los Angeles Police Department
- Rank: Chief of Police 1923–1924

August Vollmer (March 7, 1876 – November 4, 1955) was the first police chief of Berkeley, California, and a leading figure in the development of the field of criminal justice in the United States in the early 20th century. He has been described as "the father of modern policing". Vollmer played an influential role in introducing early 20th-century police reforms, which increasingly militarized police departments in the United States. A veteran of the Spanish–American War in the Philippines and the Philippine–American War, Vollmer introduced reforms that reflected his experiences in the U.S. military.

== Early life ==
Vollmer was born in New Orleans to German immigrant parents, John and Philopine (Klundt) Vollmer. His father saw to it that he learned to box and swim, both of which he excelled at. Upon his father's death, his mother returned to Germany with her children for two years, after which she returned to New Orleans in 1886, but soon thereafter decided to move her family to San Francisco. In July 1890, the Vollmer family moved across the bay to Berkeley.

Before he was 20, August helped organize the North Berkeley Volunteer Fire Department, and in 1897, was awarded the Berkeley Fireman medal. He supported his mother and the rest of his family as a partner in Patterson and Vollmer, a hay, grain, wood and coal supply store, at the corner of Shattuck Avenue and Vine Street near a fire station north of downtown Berkeley.

In 1898, August enlisted in the Eighth Corps of the United States Army, fighting in numerous engagements in the Spanish–American War in the Philippines as well as taking part in occupation duties following the close of formal combat. Vollmer left the military in August 1899 and returned to Berkeley. In March 1900, he began working for the local post office.

== Law enforcement ==
In 1904, Vollmer became a local hero when he leapt onto a runaway railroad freight car on Shattuck Avenue in downtown Berkeley and applied its brakes, preventing a disastrous collision with a loaded passenger coach at the Berkeley station. This event led to his election as town marshal on April 10, 1905.

In 1907, Vollmer was re-elected town marshal. He was also elected president of the California Association of Police Chiefs, even though, by title, he was not yet a police chief himself. In 1909, Berkeley created the office of police chief, and Vollmer became the first to hold that office.

Drawing on his military experience, and his own research, Vollmer reorganized the Berkeley police force. Vollmer had discovered that very little literature existed in the United States on the subject of police work, so he located and read a number of European works on the subject, in particular, Criminal Psychology, by Hans Gross, an Austrian criminologist, and Memoirs of Vidocq, by Eugène-François Vidocq, head of the detective division of the French police in Paris. He then set out on a program of modernization. He established a bicycle patrol and created the first centralized police records system, designed to streamline and organize criminal investigations. He established a call box network and he trained his deputies in marksmanship.

In the ensuing years, Vollmer's reputation as the "father of modern law enforcement" grew. He was the first chief to require that police officers attain college degrees, and persuaded the University of California to teach criminal justice. In 1916, UC Berkeley established a criminal justice program, headed by Vollmer. At Berkeley, he taught O. W. Wilson, who went on to become a professor and continued efforts to professionalize policing, by being the first to establish the first police science degree at Municipal University of Wichita (now Wichita State University). This is often seen as the start of criminal justice as an academic field.

Vollmer's courses taught how there were "racial types", and how "heredity" and "racial degeneration" contributed to crime.

Vollmer was also the first police chief to create a motorized force, placing officers on motorcycles and in cars so that they could patrol a broader area with greater efficiency. Radios were included in patrol cars. He was also the first to use the lie detector, developed at the University of California, in police work. Vollmer supported programs to assist disadvantaged children, and was often criticized for his leniency towards petty offenders such as drunks and loiterers. He also encouraged the employment and training of African American (first hired in 1919) and female (first hired in 1925) police officers. This included the hiring of Walter A. Gordon, who became the recipient of the Benjamin Ide Wheeler Medal in 1955.

In 1921, Vollmer was elected president of the International Association of Chiefs of Police. Vollmer left the Berkeley Police Department for a brief stint as police chief of the Los Angeles Police Department from 1923 to 1924, but returned upon being disillusioned by the extent of corruption and hostility towards leadership coming from outside the department. Nonetheless, Vollmer introduced militaristic reforms to the LAPD.

Vollmer married Millicent Gardner in 1924. They had no children. In 1924, Vollmer played himself in the silent serial Officer 444 which was filmed in Berkeley under the direction of John Ford's brother Francis Ford.

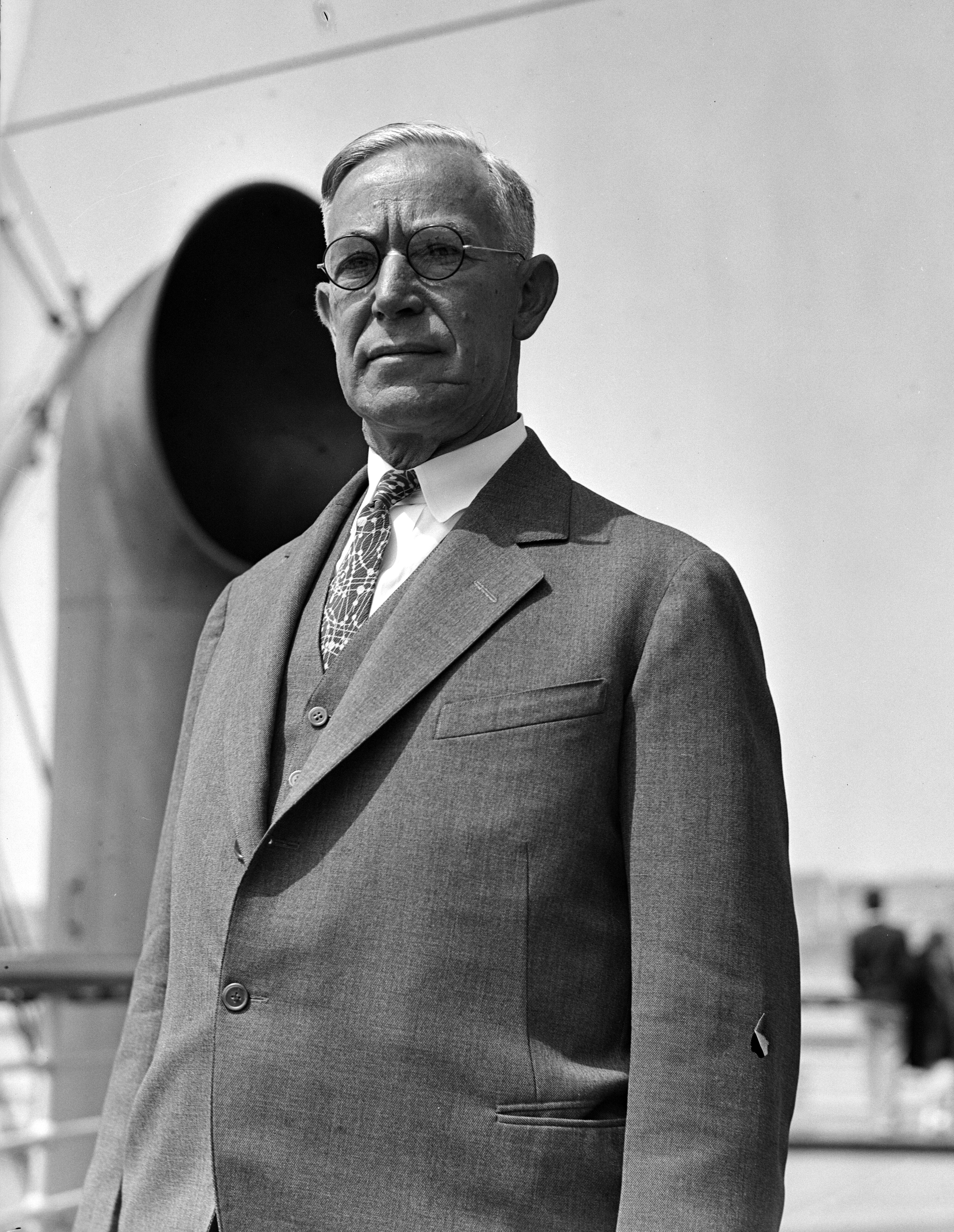
Vollmer in 1934

Vollmer contributed to sections of the Wickersham Commission national criminal justice report of 1931, namely to the fourteenth and final volume, The Police, which advocated for a well-selected, well-educated, and well-funded professionalized police force. Other portions of the Wickersham report were sharply critical of current police practice; one of the volumes was entitled Lawlessness in Law Enforcement. Vollmer was the 1931 recipient of the Benjamin Ide Wheeler Medal.

He retired from the Berkeley Police in 1932 as his eyesight began to fail. He was then appointed as a professor of police administration in the Political Science Department at the University of California, and went on to found its School of Criminology. He was also among the five people elected as the first directors of the East Bay Regional Parks District in 1934. The same year Vollmer was awarded the Public Welfare Medal from the National Academy of Sciences. Vollmer authored the 1936 book The Police and Modern Society. In 1941, he was instrumental in the establishment of what would become the American Society of Criminology, the leading professional criminological association in the world.

== Drug prohibition ==
Vollmer was against police involvement with the problem of drug addiction, which he viewed as a medical and regulatory issue rather than a criminal one: "Like prostitution, and like liquor, drug use was not a police problem; it never has been and never can be solved by policemen." Vollmer wrote that enforcement of moralistic vice laws leads to police corruption and "engenders disrespect both for law and for the agents of law enforcement." Vollmer supported the establishment of federal distribution, at cost, of habit-forming drugs. Vollmer's views, however, found little favor in the prohibitionist-dominated consensus of the time.

== Later life and death ==
Late in life, Vollmer developed Parkinson's disease and cancer. On the morning of November 4, 1955, he told his housekeeper, "I'm going to shoot myself. Call the Berkeley Police", then stepped outside and did so.

== Tributes ==
- Bald Peak in the hills above Berkeley was renamed Vollmer Peak in 1940.
- In 2004 the Alameda County Sheriff's Office christened a new 32-foot custom patrol boat the August Vollmer.
- In 1959 the American Society of Criminology established the August Vollmer Award to recognize an individual whose scholarship or professional activities have made outstanding contributions to justice or to the treatment or prevention of criminal or delinquent behavior.
- In the Nero Wolfe detective stories created by Rex Stout, Wolfe's doctor, who frequently helps him with his cases, is Dr. Vollmer.

== Notes ==
Police appointments
Preceded by Louis D. Oaks	Chief of LAPD; 1923–1924	Succeeded by R. Lee Heath
