= Warm little pond =

Hypothetical Earth environment for the origin of life

A warm little pond is a hypothetical terrestrial shallow water environment on early Earth under which the origin of life could have occurred. The term was originally coined by Charles Darwin in an 1871 letter to his friend Joseph Dalton Hooker. This idea is related to later work such as the Oparin–Haldane hypothesis and the Miller–Urey experiment, which respectively provided a hypothesis for life's origin from a primordial soup of organics and a proof of concept for the mechanism by which biomolecules and their precursors may have formed.

A prerequisite condition for the formation of warm little ponds on early Earth is the stable environment of exposed land. While uncertain, it has been proposed based on geo-dynamical modeling that continents may have been present around the time of the origin of life; probably more certain is that higher levels of volcanism on early Earth resulted in the presence of volcanic islands on which shallow lake environments may have formed.

In modern prebiotic chemistry, warm little ponds are invoked in certain abiogenesis hypotheses that propose life first developed in shallow water environments on land, such as terrestrial hotsprings or evaporative lakes, as opposed to in the ocean, such as around hydrothermal vent fields. Warm little ponds are associated with a number of conditions many researchers believe may have been conducive to the origin of life, including general spatial and temporal heterogeneity. Several key points of abiogenesis hypotheses associated with this idea are the ability of wet–dry cycles to concentrate reactants, an energy source in the form of solar ultraviolet radiation, the ability of lipids to spontaneously form vesicles in freshwater, and the presence of mineral surfaces as a platform for polymerization reactions between biological precursor molecules.

== Historical context ==
=== Darwin's proposal ===
Charles Darwin was privately convinced that life had originated through a natural process. However, this was beyond the scope of his research and theorizing, which he introduced in his 1859 book On the Origin of Species. Heinrich Georg Bronn, German translator of the book, said in 1860 that this made Darwin's theory incomplete; Darwin privately commented to his friend Charles Lyell that this seemed about as logical as saying there "was no use in Newton showing laws of attraction of gravity & consequent movements of the Planets, because he could not show what the attra[c]tion of Gravity is." Darwin made this point in the 1861 third edition of his book, stating "It is no valid objection that science as yet throws no light on the far higher problem of the essence or origin of life. Who can explain what is the essence of the attraction of gravity?" In 1862 Darwin"s supporter Ernst Haeckel commented in a footnote that the "chief defect of the Darwinian theory is that it throws no light on the origin of the primitive organism—probably a simple cell—from which all the others have descended." Darwin did not object.

Hooker forwarded to Darwin the 28 March 1863 issue of The Athenaeum which included an anonymous review (soon shown to be by biologist Richard Owen) attacking Darwin's reference in early editions of his book to "some one primordial form, into which life was first breathed" by saying this used Pentateuchal terms. Darwin had already regretted this terminology, and had revised it in the third edition. He told Hooker he "really meant 'appeared' by some wholly unknown process.– It is mere rubbish thinking, at present, of origin of life; one might as well think of origin of matter." On 18 April he sent his detailed response to the magazine, which was quick to publish it:

"There must have been a time when inorganic elements alone existed on our planet: [...] Now is there a fact, or a shadow of a fact, supporting the belief that these elements, without the presence of any organic compounds, and acted on only by known forces, could produce a living creature? At present it is to us a result absolutely inconceivable. "

— Charles Darwin, Letter in The Athenæum, 25 April 1863

In his 1868 book The Variation of Animals and Plants under Domestication, Darwin said the topic was "quite beyond the scope of science". Though it was not published during his lifetime, a letter written by Darwin to botanist Joseph Dalton Hooker on 1 February 1871 proposed the prescient idea that abiogenesis may have occurred in a shallow lake environment,:

It is often said that all the conditions for the first production of a living organism are now present, which could ever have been present.— But if (& oh what a big if) we could conceive in some warm little pond with all sorts of ammonia & phosphoric salts,—light, heat, electricity &c present, that a protein compound was chemically formed, ready to undergo still more complex changes, at the present day such matter wd be instantly devoured, or absorbed, which would not have been the case before living creatures were formed.

— Charles Darwin, Letter to J. D. Hooker

These words, lightly edited, were quoted in The Life and Letters of Charles Darwin, published in 1887. A copy of this letter was included in Melvin Calvin's 1969 book Chemical evolution: Molecular evolution towards the origin of living systems on the Earth and elsewhere, and the term "warm little pond" has since been invoked in the scientific literature as a descriptor for shallow lakes or ponds as candidate environments for the origin of life.

=== Oparin–Haldane hypothesis ===
The general idea of a warm little pond-like environment was subsequently echoed in abiogenesis theories following this initial proposal, notably the Oparin–Haldane theory. While it is unclear if he was aware of Darwin's 1871 letter, Soviet biochemist Alexander Oparin was known to subscribe to the Darwinian theory of evolution, which was widely accepted in Russia at the time. In 1924, he published a booklet, The Origin of Life, suggesting a scenario in which commonly available volatiles would have been oxidized in the early atmosphere to form various hydrocarbons such as alcohols, ketones, and aldehydes. After precipitation into seawater, these may have reacted to form complex biomolecules, and eventually given rise to the first cells. This idea is often referred to as the heterotrophic origin of life, as it suggests the first organisms obtained energy and carbon from organic molecules as opposed to carbon dioxide ($\ce{CO_2}$).

Oparin's idea was formulated independently from and prior to J. B. S. Haldane's proposal for the origin of life, which suggested in 1929 that ultraviolet induced photochemistry may have produced simple organics from a mixture of $\ce{CO_2}$ and ammonia ($\ce{NH_3}$) in the young oceans. These substances would have increased in concentration, eventually forming a primordial soup that provided a platform and ample feedstocks for the prebiotic chemistry leading to the first lifeforms. Eventually, this early life would have utilized and depleted these organics until it became capable of synthesizing them itself. While there are some distinctions between the two ideas related to the nature of the first metabolism, due to their similarities and simultaneity, the joining of these theories is referred to as the Oparin–Haldane hypothesis for the origin of life.

=== Miller–Urey experiment ===
Several decades later, the Miller–Urey experiment provided the first empirical basis for these ideas. Inspired by Oparin's theory, University of Chicago chemists Stanley Miller and Harold Urey applied an electric discharge analogous to a lightning strike to a seawater-like system of water and reduced gasses meant to simulate the prebiotic atmosphere including hydrogen, methane, and ammonia. This experiment resulted in the formation of a number of amino acids and other biomolecule precursors after several days.

It is noteworthy that in determining an energy source for the experiment, Miller and Urey acknowledged that ultraviolet light was probably the most promising candidate in terms of its availability at the time of the origin of life, but faced experimental limitations in examining it. From this point on, "chemical evolution" experiments that seek to describe the prebiotic processes that led to the first cell formation have only gained traction in the origin of life field.

== Modern context ==
=== Evidence for land on early Earth ===
While contested, the earliest possible evidence for the origin of life is the biogenic-like carbon isotope ratio in a graphite inclusion inside a single Jack Hills zircon, which would date it to 4.1 billion years ago (Ga). More definitive evidence of life on Earth is fossil evidence of stromatolites in Australia from 3.49 Ga. This information means that when considering the plausibility of warm little ponds for the origin of life, emerged early continental crust or volcanic islands above sea level in the early Archean is key.

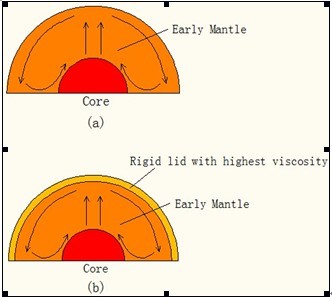
A visualization of stagnant lid tectonics, in which convection occurs beneath a rigid lid-like lithosphere.

The earliest geologic evidence for exposed land is from about 3.8 billion years ago in the form of beach gravel from Isua, Greenland. It is unknown if continental emergence occurred or was widespread prior to this. Due to much higher levels of radiogenic heat flux early in Earth's history, the modern plate tectonic regime probably had not yet developed; it was instead possibly characterized by a vertical or stagnant lid regime, but geo-dynamical constraints on these assumptions are broad and there is little agreement among models.

However, high internal heating likely also led to a significant amount of volcanism, which could have provided both a source of heat and exposed land in the form of volcanic islands. These may have been similar to volcanic island arcs in the style of today's Hawaiian Islands. In fact, a relatively slow plate tectonic regime provides a basis for the assumption of a relatively old seafloor, the low elasticity of which may have allowed hotspot islands and oceanic plateaus to reach exposed levels as far back as the late Hadean. It is even hypothesized that any such islands would have subsequently been eroded into the ocean, allowing products of prebiotic chemistry to intermix and evolve.

=== Relevance to prebiotic chemistry ===
==== Wet–dry cycles ====
Wet–dry cycles can serve as a mechanism to concentrate reactants, generate gradients in temperature or pH, and drive both dehydration and hydrolysis reactions, which are favorable under dry conditions and in solution respectively. Environmental fluctuations may have produced these cycles in early terrestrial environments, which have been shown to bring about a wide range of organic mixtures whose compositions vary with conditions such as pH and salinity.

Wet–dry cycling may have resulted from a number of different mechanisms in different environments, including hot spring or geyser action, evaporative cycles, seasonal climactic cycles, or daily weather cycles. Temporally, cycles may range from minutes to weeks depending on their driver. The action of wet–dry cycles is key to the hot spring hypothesis for the origin of life, which suggests protocells developed through a multistep process in which spontaneously formed lipid vesicles incorporate polymers that grow through condensation reactions. It has been furthermore suggested that the interactions between these cells as a gel-like substance during the transition between each cycle could have constituted a precursor to multicellular life. It has been shown that small peptides can self assemble during the dehydration phase in the presence of fatty acid micelles, and that fatty acid and phospholipid vesicles can retain their contents during this phase.

There is some theoretical and experimental evidence for nucleobase formation and stability in warm little ponds as well, possibly preceding the hypothetical RNA world stage of chemical evolution. One possibility is the exogenous delivery of simple organics ranging from amino acids to nucleobases via carbonaceous meteorites (such as the Murchison meteorite), after which seasonal wet–dry cycles would lead to the onset of polymerization into nucleotides and eventually RNA. Numerical modeling has suggested RNA could have appeared after just several of these cycles.

While it is generally difficult to synthesize the pyrimidine nitrogenous bases (cytosine, thymine, and uracil) abiotically, there is evidence for the possibility of endogenous production as well. Cytosine and uracil can be formed by reactions involving high (~ 1 M) concentrations of urea at high pH. These conditions may have been plausible in lagoons or beaches on early landmasses that experienced drying, because urea is highly soluble and most likely would not have evaporated out of solution during desiccation.

==== Effects of ultraviolet (UV) light ====
Several variants of cyanosulfidic chemistries associated with UV irradiation have been identified. For instance, it is possible to fix $\ce{CO_2}$ through UV photochemistry in mildly alkaline water via irradiating glycolate and sulfite, and thereby generate organics including citrate, malate, and succinate, all of which are TCA cycle intermediates. Cyanide acts as a reductant and a carbon source in these reactions.

UV photolysis of bisulfide is also capable of oxidizing lactate into other metabolic intermediates, and ribose precursors can be formed from hydrogen cyanide (HCN) through UV irradiation. Alkaline lakes in particular may have provided the best setting for this scenario due to the precipitation and dissolution of sodium ferrocyanide salts in these environments, which were likely to have been common on early Earth due to weathering of ultramafic rocks. This could have provided a source of cyanide to early prebiotic reaction networks, as could have exogenous delivery.

However, UV light also has the potential to damage delicate biomolecules in the absence of shielding. In this context, it has been pointed out that cytosine, thymine, uracil, adenine, and guanine are relatively stable when irradiated with UV light. Therefore, it is possible that sunlight acted to select these bases in particular as the building blocks of RNA and DNA.

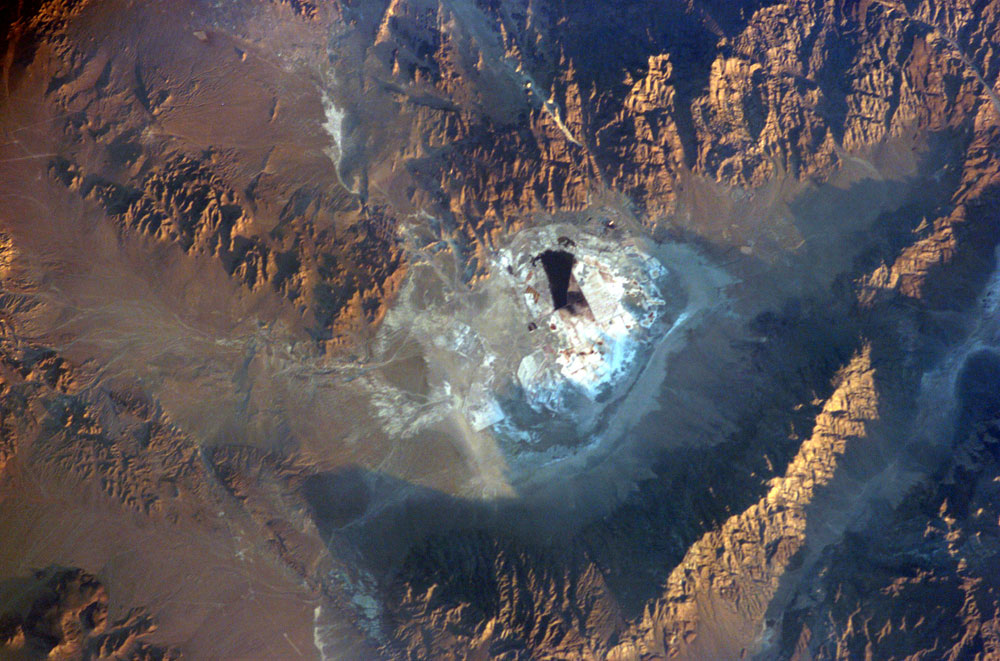
Searles Lake, a carbonate rich dry lake in the Mojave Desert that has been analyzed as a possible analogue environment for the origin of life

==== Solution composition and characteristics ====
It has been suggested that freshwater terrestrial lakes might be the most ideal settings for the abiogenesis due to the tendency of lipids to spontaneously form vesicles with semi-permeable membranes, which could have led to the first encapsulation or cell precursors. These structures lack the ion pumps of extant cells to flush ions out of the membrane, and therefore tend to collapse in brines like seawater.

Studies of extant cell cytosol have also suggested broad connections between the habitat of early cells, which would have been in approximate compositional equilibrium with their environments. From elemental ($\ce{K^+/Na^+}$) ratios, the closest matches may be terrestrial anoxic hydrothermal waters.

The tendency of phosphate, an important building block of cell membranes and nucleotides, to form insoluble minerals, is a common issue facing the geochemical relevance of many prebiotic reaction schemes as well as the idea that life originated in a marine setting. In carbonate-rich alkaline lakes specifically, such as Last Chance Lake in Canada, precipitation of calcium as calcium carbonate ($\ce{CaCO_3}$) can prevent sequestering of phosphate as the carbonate mineral apatite ($\ce{Ca_5PO_4}$), greatly increasing its availability in solution.

==== Clays and mineral surfaces ====
Theoretical and experimental work has shown that mineral surfaces were likely to have been agents of surface chemistry in alkaline and acid lakes. Clays have a large capacity for adsorption, leading to an ability to concentrate reactants and act as templates for polymerization. It has been shown that the rate of amino acid polymerization is significantly increased in the presence of montmorillonite clays through adsorption to clay particles; in fact, the formation of peptides up to 55 amino acids long has been demonstrated . The presence of borate minerals can also stabilize ribose, the desired product of the formose reaction. However, levels of adsorption that are too high can also act to remove necessary biomolecules from solution.
