= Proto-metabolism =

Chemical reactions which turn into modern metabolism

A proto-metabolism is a network of linked chemical reactions in a prebiotic environment that resembled modern metabolic pathways but was primarily controlled by external factors such as minerals, environmental conditions, and geochemistry rather than by internally produced molecular components. Combining ongoing research in astrobiology and prebiotic chemistry, work in this area focuses on reconstructing the connections between potential metabolic processes that may have occurred in early Earth conditions. Proto-metabolism is believed to be simpler than modern metabolism and the Last Universal Common Ancestor (LUCA), as simple organic molecules likely gave rise to more complex metabolic networks. Prebiotic chemists have demonstrated abiotic generation of many simple organic molecules including amino acids, fatty acids, simple sugars, and nucleobases. There are multiple scenarios bridging prebiotic chemistry to early metabolic networks that occurred before the origins of life, also known as abiogenesis. In addition, there are hypotheses made on the evolution of biochemical pathways including the metabolism-first hypothesis, which theorizes how reaction networks dissipate free energy from which genetic molecules and proto-cell membranes later emerge. To determine the composition of key early metabolic networks, scientists have also used top-down approaches to study LUCA and modern metabolism.

== Proto metabolism and minimal metabolism ==
Two related but distinct concepts are important for understanding the origins of metabolism:

Proto metabolism refers to the actual metabolic like chemistry that existed on prebiotic Earth. Kee and Monnard describe the "internal catalytic network, often referred to as 'metabolism'" as "the set of catalysts/catalytic assemblies that a protocell would have required to process resources into its own building blocks." Critically, early proto metabolic systems relied on external support: "From its simplest form, based on encapsulated metal-ions and complexes or even mineral particles, this reaction system would have gradually evolved first into RNA-based and, over time, into protein catalytic networks, i.e. towards metabolic bio-machinery."

Minimal metabolism is a theoretical concept describing the minimum requirements for chemistry to become truly metabolic. Lauber et al. (2021) define it as "a heuristic construct, halfway between chemistry and biology" that stands "at the interface between non-equilibrium complex chemistries and biological systems." Unlike proto metabolism that describes non genetic and non enzymatic reaction networks driven by the environment, minerals, and simple organics, minimal metabolism represents the next stage: the earliest cellular metabolic system with some enzymes and genetic control, capable of supporting growth and division while still depending on environmental gradients.

== Heterotrophic versus autotrophic origin ==
The heterotrophic hypothesis, also known as the Oparin–Haldane hypothesis, proposes that the first organisms were heterotrophs that obtained energy and carbon from organic molecules accumulated through abiotic synthesis in the primitive environment. Alexander Oparin (1924) and J.B.S. Haldane (1929) independently argued that since heterotrophic anaerobes are metabolically simpler than autotrophs, heterotrophy must have evolved first. This concept traces back to Charles Darwin's 1871 speculation about life originating in "some warm little pond" containing ammonia, phosphoric salts, and energy sources where protein compounds could form. The Miller–Urey experiment (1953) provided experimental support by demonstrating abiotic synthesis of amino acids and other biochemically significant molecules under simulated early Earth conditions.

The autotrophic hypothesis proposes that the earliest life forms were autotrophs capable of synthesizing organic molecules from inorganic carbon (CO_{2}) using geochemical energy. Günter Wächtershäuser's iron–sulfur world theory suggests that life originated at hydrothermal vents where iron sulfide and nickel sulfide minerals catalyzed carbon fixation from volcanic gases. Experimental work demonstrated synthesis of activated acetic acid and peptide bond formation on (Fe,Ni)S surfaces under prebiotic conditions. The two hypotheses are not mutually exclusive; the FeS/H_{2}S reducing chemistry central to autotrophic models is also consistent with heterotrophic scenarios.

== Autocatalytic prebiotic chemistries ==
Autocatalytic reactions are reactions where the reaction product acts as a catalyst for its own formation. Many researchers that study proto-metabolism agree that early metabolic networks likely originated as a set of chemical reactions that form self-sustaining networks. This set of reactions is commonly referred to as an autocatalytic set. Some prebiotic chemistries focus on these autocatalytic reactions including the formose reaction, HCN oligomerization, and formamide chemistry.

=== Formose reaction ===
Discovered in 1861 by Aleksandr Butlerov, the formose reaction is a set of two reactions converting formaldehyde (CH_{2}O) to a mixture of simple sugars. Formaldehyde is an intermediate in the oxidation of simple carbon molecules (e.g. methane) and was likely present in early Earth's atmosphere. The first reaction is the slow conversion of formaldehyde (C1 carbon) to glycolaldehyde (C2 carbon) and occurs through an unknown mechanism. The second reaction is the faster and autocatalytic formation of higher weight aldoses and ketoses. The kinetics of the formose reaction are often described as autocatalytic, as the alkaline reaction uses lowest molecular weight sugars as feedstocks or input molecules into the reaction. Self-organized autocatalytic networks, like the formose reaction, would allow for adaptation to changing prebiotic environmental conditions. As a proof-of-concept, Robinson and colleagues demonstrated how changing environmental conditions and catalyst availability can impact the resultant sugar products.

In the past, many researchers have suggested the importance of this reaction for abiogenesis and the origins of metabolism because it can lead to ribose. Ribose is a building block of RNA and an important precursor in proto-metabolism. However, there are limitations for the formose reaction to be the chemical origin of sugars including the low chemoselectivity for ribose and high complexity of the final reaction mixture. In addition, a direct joining of ribose, a nucleobase, and phosphate to make a ribonucleotide (the building block of RNA) is not currently chemically feasible. Alternative prebiotic mechanisms have been proposed including cyanosulfidic prebiotic chemistries.

=== HCN oligomerization ===
On Earth, hydrogen cyanide (HCN) is made in volcanos, lightning, and reducing atmospheres like the Miller-Urey experiment. On the Hadean Earth, large impactor events and active hydrothermal processes likely contributed to widespread metal production and metal-based proto-metabolism. Hydrogen cyanide has also been detected in meteorites and atmospheres in the outer solar system.

HCN-derived polymers are the oligomer or hydrolysis products of HCN. These polymers can be synthesized from HCN or cyanide salts often in alkaline conditions, but they have been observed in a wide range of experimental conditions. HCN readily reacts with itself to produce many HCN polymers and biologically relevant compounds like nucleobases, amino acids, and carboxylic acids. The diversity of products could point to a plausible proto-metabolic network of HCN oligomerization reactions. Although, some groups point to low HCN concentrations in early Earth and low chemioselectivity of key biologically relevant products, similar to the formose reaction. Others have shown that abundant HCN is produced after large impacts and that high specificity and yield can be achieved.

=== Formamide chemistry ===
Formamide (NH_{2}CHO) is the simplest naturally occurring amide. Similar to HCN, formamide can form naturally. Formamide has specific physical and stability properties possibly suitable for a universal prebiotic precursor for early proto-metabolic networks. For example, it has four universal atomic elements ubiquitous to life: C, H, O, N. The presence of unique functional groups involving oxygen and nitrogen support reaction chemistries to build key biomolecules like amino acids, sugars, nucleosides and other key intermediates of other prebiotic reactions (e.g. the citric acid cycle). In addition, early Earth geological features like hydrothermal pores might support formamide chemistry and synthesis of key prebiotic biomolecules with concentration requirements.

Overall, formamide chemistry can support connections and substrates needed to support prebiotic biomolecule synthesis including the formose reaction, Strecker synthesis, HCN oligomerization, or the Fischer-Tropsch process. In addition, formamide can be easily concentrated through evaporation reactions as it has a boiling point of 210C. Although this reaction has high versatility across one-carbon atom precursors, the connections between different biosynthetic pathways are yet to be directly explored experimentally.

== Experimental reconstruction ==
Many research groups are actively attempting experimental reconstruction of the interactions between prebiotic reactions. One major consideration is the ability for these reactions to operate in the same environmental conditions. These one-pot syntheses would likely push the reaction towards specific subgroups of molecules. The key to building proto-metabolic scenarios involves coupling constructive and interconversion reactions. Constructive reactions use autocatalytic prebiotic chemistries to increase the structural complexity of the original molecule, while interconversion reactions connect different prebiotic chemistries by changing the functional groups appended to the original molecule. A functional group is a group of atoms that has similar properties whenever it appears in different molecules. These interconversion reactions and functional group transformations can lead to new prebiotic chemistries and precursor molecules.

=== Cyanosulfidic scenario ===
Cyanosulfidic scenarios are mechanisms for proto-metabolism proposed by the Eschenmoser and Sutherland groups. Research from the Eschenmoser group suggested that interactions between HCN and aldehydes can catalyze the formation of diaminomaleodinitrile (DAMN). Iterations of this cycle would generate multiple intermediate metabolites and key biomolecular precursors through functional group transformations by hydrolytic and redox processes. To expand upon this finding, the Sutherland group experimentally assessed the assembly of biomolecular building blocks from prebiotic intermediates and one-carbon feedstocks. They synthesized precursors of ribonucleotides, amino acids and lipids from the reactants of hydrogen cyanide, acetylene, acrylonitrile (product of cyanide and acetylene), and dihydroxyacetone (stable triose isomer of glyceraldehyde and phosphate). These reactions are driven by UV light and use hydrogen sulfide (H_{2}S) as the primary reductant in these reactions. As each of these synthesis reactions was tested independently and some reactions require periodic input of additional reactants, these biomolecular precursors were not strictly generated through a one-pot synthesis expected of early Earth environments. In the same work, these authors argue that flow chemistry or the movement of reactants through water could generate the conditions favorable for the synthesis of these molecules.

=== Glyoxylate scenario ===
Eschenmoser also proposed a parallel scenario where the connections between prebiotic reactions would be connected by glyoxylate, a simple α-ketoacid, produced by HCN oligomerization and hydrolysis. In this work, Eschenmoser proposes potential schemes to generate both informational oligomers and other key autocatalytic reactions from plausible one-carbon sources (HCN, CO, CO_{2}).

The Krishnamurthy group at Scripps experimentally expanded on this theory. In mild aqueous conditions, they demonstrated that the reaction of glyoxylate and pyruvate can produce a series of α-ketoacid intermediates constituting the reductive tricarboxylic acid (TCA) cycle. This reaction proceeded without metal or enzyme catalysts as glyoxylate acted as both the carbon source and reducing agent in the reaction. Similarly, the Moran group have also reported pyruvate and glyoxylate can react in warm iron-rich water to produce TCA intermediates and some amino acids. Their work has successfully reconstructed 9 out of 11 TCA intermediates and 5 universal metabolic precursors. Additional experimental analysis is needed to connect this scenario to modern metabolism.

== Energy sources ==
Unlike proto-metabolism, the bioenergetic pathways powering modern metabolism are well understood. In early Earth conditions, there were mainly three kinds of energy to support early metabolic pathways: high energy sources to catalyze monomers, lower energy sources to support condensation or polymerization, and energy carriers that support transfer of energy from the environment to metabolic networks. Examples of high energy sources include photochemical energy from ultraviolet light, atmospheric electric discharge, and geological electrochemical energy. These energy sources would support synthesis of biological monomers or feedstocks for proto-metabolism. In contrast, examples of lower energy sources for assembly of more complex molecules include anhydrous heat, mineral-catalyzed synthesis, and sugar-driven reactions. Energy carrier molecules could allow for propagation of the energy through the metabolic networks likely resembled modern energy carriers including ATP and NADH. Both energy carriers are nucleotide-based molecules and likely originated early in metabolism.

== Gene-first versus metabolism-first hypotheses ==
=== Gene-first ===
The gene-first hypothesis proposes that the first living systems were self-replicating informational molecules, most likely RNA, capable of both storing genetic information and catalyzing chemical reactions. Under this model, simple self-replicating molecules would evolve under selective pressures into increasingly complex organisms.

A key advantage of the gene-first hypothesis is that a single molecule capable of template-directed replication can evolve readily if modifications breed true, whereas metabolic networks are fundamentally resistant to evolutionary change.

An autocatalytic network is a set of chemical reactions where the products of some reactions act as catalysts to accelerate other reactions in the same network. In simpler terms, chemicals in the network help each other form more chemicals, creating a self-sustaining and self-replicating system. A common challenge in metabolism-first origin-of-life theories is that chemical networks without genes tend to resist change. Imagine a system where one chemical (A) helps make a second chemical (B), and this second chemical (B) helps make more of the first (A). This creates a self-replicating loop but is hard to evolve because even if a better version of the first chemical (A') appears, the system only makes the original kind (B), not the improved one (B'). For this system to evolve, the better first (A`) chemical would also need to help make a better second chemical (B'), which then helps make more of the better first chemical (A'), a very unlikely chain. In more complex networks involving multiple chemicals helping make each other, this difficulty of evolving increases dramatically as the network grows. .

The discovery of ribozymes—RNA molecules with catalytic activity—by Thomas Cech and Sidney Altman, recognized with the Nobel Prize in Chemistry in 1989, provided crucial support for this hypothesis.

=== Metabolism-first ===
Metabolism-first hypothesis suggests that autocatalytic networks of metabolic reactions were the first forms of life. This is an alternative hypothesis to RNA-world, which is a genes-first hypothesis. It was first proposed by Martynas Ycas in 1955. A lot of recent work in this area is focused in computational modeling of theoretical prebiotic networks.

Metabolism-first proponents postulate that replication and genetic machinery could not arise without the accumulation of the molecules needed for replication. Alone, simple connections between prebiotic synthesis reactions could form key organic molecules and once encapsulated by a membrane would constitute the first cells. These reactions could be catalyzed by various inorganic molecules or ions and stabilized by solid surfaces. Molecular self-replicators and enzymes would emerge later, with these future metabolisms better resembling modern metabolism.

One critique for the metabolism-first hypothesis for abiogenesis is they would also need self-replicating abilities with a high degree of fidelity. If not, the chemical networks with greater fitness in early Earth would not be preserved. There is limited experimental evidence for these theories, so additional exploration in this area is needed to determine the feasibility of a metabolism-first origins of life.

== See also ==
- First universal common ancestor, may or may not have had such proto-metabolism
