= Genes-first hypothesis =

Hypothesis in biology

The genes-first hypothesis, also known as the replication-first hypothesis, is one of the competing theories in the study of the origin of life. This theory proposes that one of the earliest stages in the emergence of life may have been 'genes' or 'replicators', referring to simple molecules with the abilities to self-replicate, encode information, and evolve in a heritable manner.

This theory contrasts with the Metabolism-First Hypothesis which instead argues that early metabolic processes, likely in the form of self-sustaining networks of chemical reactions, preceded the emergence of genes and catalyzed their development.

Additionally, the genes-first hypothesis is closely linked to the theory of a primitive RNA World, in which early life utilized RNA for both its genetic material and catalytic machinery prior to the emergence of DNA and enzymes respectively.

== Candidate molecules ==
A primary molecular candidate for the substrate of the first 'genes' is RNA as it is a molecule with the key capacities to both encode information in its sequence and catalyze reactions. The information-bearing capacity is critical to the evolution and propagation of such a molecule, while catalytic capabilities are likely necessary for a molecule to undergo some form of a self-replication reaction.

Though a promising candidate, other molecules may offer similar potential including possible RNA precursors such as Peptide Nucleic Acids (PNAs). PNAs are structurally simpler molecules with the advantage of being phosphate-free, but evidence for plausible prebiotic synthesis of such monomers is lacking.

Additionally, it has been posited that the variability in ionic composition between sheets of some clay minerals may endow them with the necessary properties that could allow them to function as a system of 'mineral genes'. However, this idea lacks experimental support and no such examples or remnants of mineral genes have been found.

== Support ==
Central to the ideas of the genes-first hypothesis and the theory of an RNA world is the emergence of a 'replicase', a single molecule with the ability to catalyze its own self-templated replication.

While experimental efforts have yet to demonstrate a self-replicating system that meets the full criteria of a replicase, intermediate demonstrations have been made. These include a short protein that catalyzes its replication from two smaller fragments and a system composed of a pair of catalytic RNA molecules (Ribozymes) that catalyze the amplification of each other.

Additionally, the simple nature of a replicase system naturally lends itself to its evolution as more efficient replicators will have an advantage that will propagate via their own increased self-production. This contrasts with the Metabolism-First hypothesis as the evolution of a metabolic network likely requires the seemingly improbable simultaneous evolution of all components in order for evolution of the network to propagate.

While some argue that the origin of a true replicase is exceedingly unlikely, others argue the same for the origins of a metabolic network, but both replication and metabolism are key characteristics of modern life. If viewing the advent of these developments as a sequence of events, some argue that though unlikely, the emergence of a replicating system that then develops metabolism is more likely than the emergence of a metabolic system that becomes replicative or a replicative metabolic system. The latter option is an important consideration as there may be a false dichotomy between the hypotheses of Genes-First and Metabolism-First where both systems co-evolved in the earliest phases of life.

== Challenges ==
Despite the supporting evidence, challenges to the genes-first theory remain:

Though replication systems have been demonstrated, there has been no experimental demonstration that meets all criteria for a replicase despite decades of experimental efforts. Demonstrating an RNA-based replicase is difficult as a high fidelity replication is necessary which likely requires a longer sequence. However, the fidelity of copies exponentially decays with sequence length and polymerization of longer strands is less favorable. Furthermore, long strands pose additional challenges in finding primordially viable ways to separate them following rounds of replication.

Others also argue that the complexity of RNA is too great and its catalytic capabilities are too limited for the context of a prebiotic environment to allow for the emergence of genes before metabolism. Some also argue that concentrations of prebiotic feedstocks are insufficient for the emergence or replicators and that the advent of metabolism laid the foundation for the development of the first replicators.
