= Abiogenesis =

Life arising from non-living matter

Stages in the origin of life process range from the well understood, such as the habitable Earth and the abiotic synthesis of simple molecules, to the largely unknown, like the derivation of the last universal common ancestor (LUCA) with its complex molecular functionalities.

Abiogenesis or the origin of life (sometimes called biopoiesis) is the natural process by which life arises from non-living matter, such as simple organic compounds. The prevailing scientific hypothesis is that the transition from non-living to living entities on Earth was not a single event, but a process of increasing complexity involving the formation of a habitable planet, the prebiotic synthesis of organic molecules, molecular self-replication, self-assembly, autocatalysis, and the emergence of cell membranes. The transition from non-life to life has not been observed experimentally, but many proposals have been made for different stages of the process.

The study of abiogenesis aims to determine how pre-life chemical reactions gave rise to life under conditions strikingly different from those on Earth today. It uses tools from biology and chemistry, attempting a synthesis of many sciences. Life functions through the chemistry of carbon and water, and builds on four chemical families: lipids for cell membranes, carbohydrates for chemical energy storage and structural composition, amino acids for protein metabolism, and the nucleic acids DNA and RNA for heredity. A theory of abiogenesis must explain the origins and interactions of these classes of molecules.

Many approaches investigate how self-replicating molecules came into existence. Researchers think that life descends from an RNA world, although other self-replicating and self-catalyzing molecules may have preceded RNA. Other approaches ("metabolism-first" hypotheses) focus on how catalysis on the early Earth might have provided the precursor molecules for self-replication. The 1952 Miller–Urey experiment demonstrated that amino acids can be synthesized from inorganic compounds under conditions like early Earth's. Subsequently, amino acids have been found in meteorites, comets, asteroids, and star-forming regions of space.

While the last universal common ancestor of all modern organisms (LUCA) existed millions of years after the origin of life, its study can guide research into early universal characteristics. A genomics approach has sought to characterize LUCA by identifying the genes shared by Archaea and Bacteria, major branches of life. It appears there are 60 proteins common to all life and 355 prokaryotic genes that trace to LUCA; their functions imply that LUCA was anaerobic with the Wood–Ljungdahl pathway, deriving energy by chemiosmosis, and used DNA, the genetic code, and ribosomes. Earlier cells might have had a leaky membrane and been powered by a naturally occurring proton gradient near a deep-sea white smoker hydrothermal vent; or, life may have originated inside the continental crust or in water at Earth's surface.

Although Earth is the only place known to harbor life, astrobiologists assume that life exists and came into being by similar processes on other planets. Geochemical and fossil evidence informs most studies. The Earth was formed at 4.54 Gya, and the earliest evidence of life on Earth dates from 3.8 Gya from Western Australia. Fossil micro-organisms may have lived in hydrothermal vent precipitates from Quebec, soon after ocean formation during the Hadean, so the process appears to have been relatively rapid in terms of geological time.

== Overview ==
NASA's 2015 strategy for astrobiology aimed to solve the puzzle of the origin of life – how a fully functioning living system could emerge from non-living components – through research on the prebiotic origin of life's chemicals, both in space and on planets, as well as the functioning of early biomolecules to catalyse reactions and support inheritance.

Life consists of reproduction with (heritable) variations. NASA defines life as "a self-sustaining chemical system capable of Darwinian evolution." Such a system is complex; the last universal common ancestor (LUCA), presumably a single-celled organism which lived some 4 billion years ago, already had hundreds of genes encoded in the DNA genetic code that is universal today. That in turn implies a suite of cellular machinery including messenger RNA, transfer RNA, and ribosomes to translate the code into proteins. Those proteins included enzymes to operate its anaerobic respiration via the Wood–Ljungdahl metabolic pathway, and a DNA polymerase to replicate its genetic material.

The challenge for origin of life researchers is to explain how such a complex and tightly interlinked system could develop by evolutionary steps, as at first sight all its parts are necessary to enable it to function. For example, a cell, whether the LUCA or in a modern organism, copies its DNA with the DNA polymerase enzyme, which is itself produced by translating the DNA polymerase gene in the DNA. Neither the enzyme nor the DNA can be produced without the other. The evolutionary process could have started with molecular self-replication, self-assembly such as of cell membranes, and autocatalysis via RNA ribozymes in an RNA world environment. The transition of non-life to life has not been observed experimentally. Some scientists see both life and the origin of life as aspects of the same process.

The preconditions to the development of a living cell like the LUCA are known, though disputed in detail: a habitable world is formed with a supply of minerals and liquid water and sources of free energy inflows such as our Sun and geothermal heat. Prebiotic synthesis creates a range of simple organic compounds, which are assembled into polymers such as proteins and RNA. On the other side, the process after the LUCA is readily understood: biological evolution caused the development of a wide range of species with varied forms and biochemical capabilities. However, the derivation of the LUCA from simple components is far from understood.

Although Earth remains the only place where life is known, the science of astrobiology seeks evidence of life on other planets. The 2015 NASA strategy on the origin of life aimed to solve the puzzle by identifying interactions, intermediary structures and functions, energy sources, and environmental factors that contributed to evolvable macromolecular systems, and mapping the chemical landscape of potential primordial informational polymers. The advent of such polymers was most likely a critical step in prebiotic chemical evolution. Those polymers derived, in turn, from simple organic compounds such as nucleobases, amino acids, and sugars, likely formed by reactions in the environment. A successful theory of the origin of life must explain how all these chemicals came into being.

== Pre-1960s conceptual history ==
The Miller–Urey experiment was a synthesis of small organic molecules in a mixture of simple gases in a thermal gradient created by heating (right) and cooling (left) the mixture at the same time, with electrical discharges.

=== Spontaneous generation ===
One ancient view of the origin of life, from Aristotle until the 19th century, was of spontaneous generation. This held that "lower" animals such as insects were generated by decaying organic substances, and that life arose by chance. This was questioned from the 17th century, in works like Thomas Browne's Pseudodoxia Epidemica. In 1665, Robert Hooke published the first drawings of a microorganism. In 1676, Antonie van Leeuwenhoek drew and described microorganisms, probably protozoa and bacteria. Van Leeuwenhoek disagreed with spontaneous generation, and by the 1680s convinced himself, using experiments ranging from sealed and open meat incubation and the close study of insect reproduction, that the theory was incorrect. In 1668 Francesco Redi showed that no maggots appeared in meat when flies were prevented from laying eggs. By the middle of the 19th century, spontaneous generation was considered disproven.

=== Panspermia ===
Dating back to Anaxagoras in the 5th century BC, panspermia is the idea that life originated elsewhere in the universe and came to Earth. The modern version of panspermia holds that life may have been distributed to Earth by meteoroids, asteroids, comets or planetoids. This shifts the origin of life to another heavenly body. The advantage is that life is not required to have formed on each planet it occurs on, but in a more limited set of locations, and then spread about the galaxy to other star systems. There is some interest in the possibility that life originated on Mars and later transferred to Earth.

=== "A warm little pond": primordial soup ===
The idea that life originated from non-living matter in slow stages appeared in Herbert Spencer's 1864–1867 book Principles of Biology, and in William Turner Thiselton-Dyer's 1879 paper "On spontaneous generation and evolution". On 1 February 1871 Charles Darwin wrote about these publications to Joseph Hooker, and set out his own speculation that the original spark of life may have been in a "warm little pond, with all sorts of ammonia and phosphoric salts,—light, heat, electricity &c present, that a protein compound was chemically formed". Darwin explained that "at the present day such matter would be instantly devoured or absorbed, which would not have been the case before living creatures were formed."

Alexander Oparin in 1924 and J. B. S. Haldane in 1929 proposed that the earliest cells slowly self-organized from a primordial soup, the Oparin–Haldane hypothesis. Haldane suggested that the Earth's prebiotic oceans consisted of a "hot dilute soup" in which organic compounds could have formed. J. D. Bernal showed that such mechanisms could form most of the necessary molecules for life from inorganic precursors. In 1967, he suggested three "stages": the origin of biological monomers; the origin of biological polymers; and the evolution from molecules to cells.

=== Miller–Urey experiment ===
In 1952, Stanley Miller and Harold Urey carried out a chemical experiment to demonstrate how organic molecules could have formed spontaneously from inorganic precursors under prebiotic conditions like those posited by the Oparin–Haldane hypothesis. It passed an electric current through a highly reducing (lacking oxygen) mixture of gases—methane, ammonia, and hydrogen, with water vapor—to form organic monomers such as amino acids.

Bernal said of the Miller–Urey experiment that "it is not enough to explain the formation of such molecules, what is necessary, is a physical-chemical explanation of the origins of these molecules that suggests the presence of suitable sources and sinks for free energy." However, current scientific consensus describes the primitive atmosphere as weakly reducing or neutral, diminishing the amount and variety of amino acids that could be produced. The addition of iron and carbonate minerals, present in early oceans, produces a diverse array of amino acids. Later work has focused on two other potential reducing environments: outer space and deep-sea hydrothermal vents.

== Producing a habitable Earth ==
Origin of life timeline
← / Earliest Universe; ← / Earliest stars; ← / Earliest galaxy; ← / Milky Way spirals; ← / Earth / Solar System; ← / LUCA; ← / Earliest fossils; ← / Earliest oxygen; ← / Atmospheric oxygen; ← / Sexual reproduction; ← / Cambrian explosion
(billion years ago)

=== Evolutionary history ===
==== Early universe with first stars ====
Soon after the Big Bang, roughly 14 Gya (14 billion years ago), the only chemical elements present in the universe were hydrogen, helium, and lithium, the three lightest atoms in the periodic table. These elements gradually condensed into vast clouds of gas, which collapsed under gravity into rotating protostellar disks. Gravitational accretion of material at the hot and dense centers of these disks formed the first stars by the fusion of hydrogen. Early stars were massive and short-lived, producing all the heavier elements by stellar nucleosynthesis. Such element formation proceeds to its most stable element Iron-56. Heavier elements were formed during supernovas at the end of a star's lifecycle.

Carbon, currently the fourth most abundant element in the universe, was formed mainly in white dwarf stars. As these stars reached the end of their lifecycles, they ejected heavier elements, including carbon and oxygen, throughout the universe. These allowed for the formation of rocky planets.

According to the nebular hypothesis, the Solar System began to form 4.6 Gya with the gravitational collapse of part of a giant molecular cloud. Most of the collapsing mass collected in the center, forming the Sun, while the rest flattened into a protoplanetary disk out of which the planets formed.

==== Emergence of Earth ====
The age of the Earth is 4.54 Gya as found by radiometric dating of calcium-aluminium-rich inclusions in carbonaceous chrondrite meteorites, the oldest material in the Solar System. Earth, during the Hadean eon (from its formation until 4.031 Gya,) was at first inhospitable to life. During its formation, the Earth lost much of its initial mass, and so lacked the gravity to hold molecular hydrogen and the bulk of the original inert gases. Soon after initial accretion of Earth at 4.48 Gya, its collision with Theia, a hypothesised impactor, is thought to have created the ejected debris that eventually formed the Moon. This impact removed the Earth's primary atmosphere, leaving behind clouds of viscous silicates and carbon dioxide. This unstable atmosphere was short-lived, soon condensing to form the bulk silicate Earth, leaving behind an atmosphere largely consisting of water vapor, nitrogen, and carbon dioxide, with smaller amounts of carbon monoxide, hydrogen, and sulfur compounds. The solution of carbon dioxide in water is thought to have made the seas slightly acidic, with a pH of about 5.5.

Condensation to form liquid oceans is theorised to have occurred as early as the Moon-forming impact. This scenario is supported by the dating of 4.404 Gya zircon crystals with high δ^{18}O values from metamorphosed quartzite of Mount Narryer in Western Australia. The Hadean atmosphere has been characterized as a "gigantic, productive outdoor chemical laboratory," similar to volcanic gases today which still support some abiotic chemistry. Despite the likely increased volcanism from early plate tectonics, the Earth may have been a predominantly water world between 4.4 and 4.3 Gya. It is debated whether crust was exposed above this ocean. Immediately after the Moon-forming impact, Earth likely had little if any continental crust, a turbulent atmosphere, and a hydrosphere subject to intense ultraviolet light from a T Tauri stage Sun. It was also affected by cosmic radiation, and continued asteroid and comet impacts.

The Late Heavy Bombardment hypothesis posits that a period of intense impact occurred at 4.1 to 3.8 Gya during the Hadean and early Archean eons. Originally it was thought that the Late Heavy Bombardment was a single cataclysmic impact event occurring at 3.9 Gya; this would have had the potential to sterilize Earth by volatilizing liquid oceans and blocking sunlight needed for photosynthesis, delaying the earliest possible emergence of life. More recent research questioned the intensity of the Late Heavy Bombardment and its potential for sterilisation. If it was not one giant impact but a period of raised impact rate, it would have had much less destructive power. The 3.9 Gya date arose from dating of Apollo mission sample returns collected mostly near the Imbrium Basin, biasing the age of recorded impacts. Impact modelling of the lunar surface reveals that rather than a cataclysmic event at 3.9 Gya, multiple small-scale, short-lived periods of bombardment likely occurred. Terrestrial data backs this idea by showing multiple periods of ejecta in the rock record both before and after the 3.9 Gya marker, suggesting that the early Earth was subject to continuous impacts with less impact on extinction.

If life evolved in the ocean at depths of more than ten meters, it would have been shielded both from late impacts and the then high levels of ultraviolet radiation from the sun. The available energy is maximized at 100–150 °C, the temperatures at which hyperthermophilic bacteria and thermoacidophilic archaea live.

==== Earliest evidence of life ====
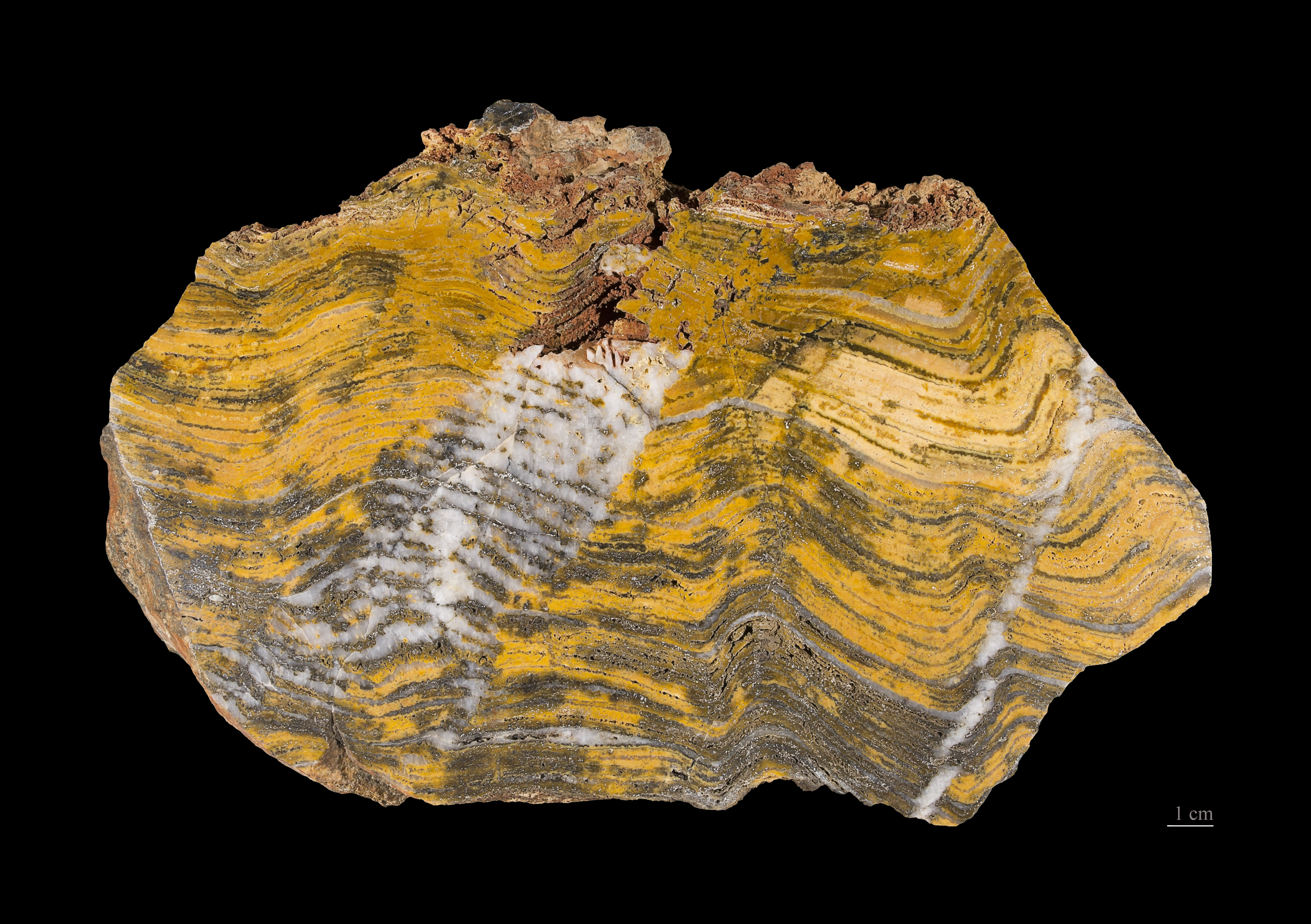
If banded iron formation rocks of Archaean age (like these from Australia) are fossilized microbialites, they would be among the earliest evidence of life-forms.

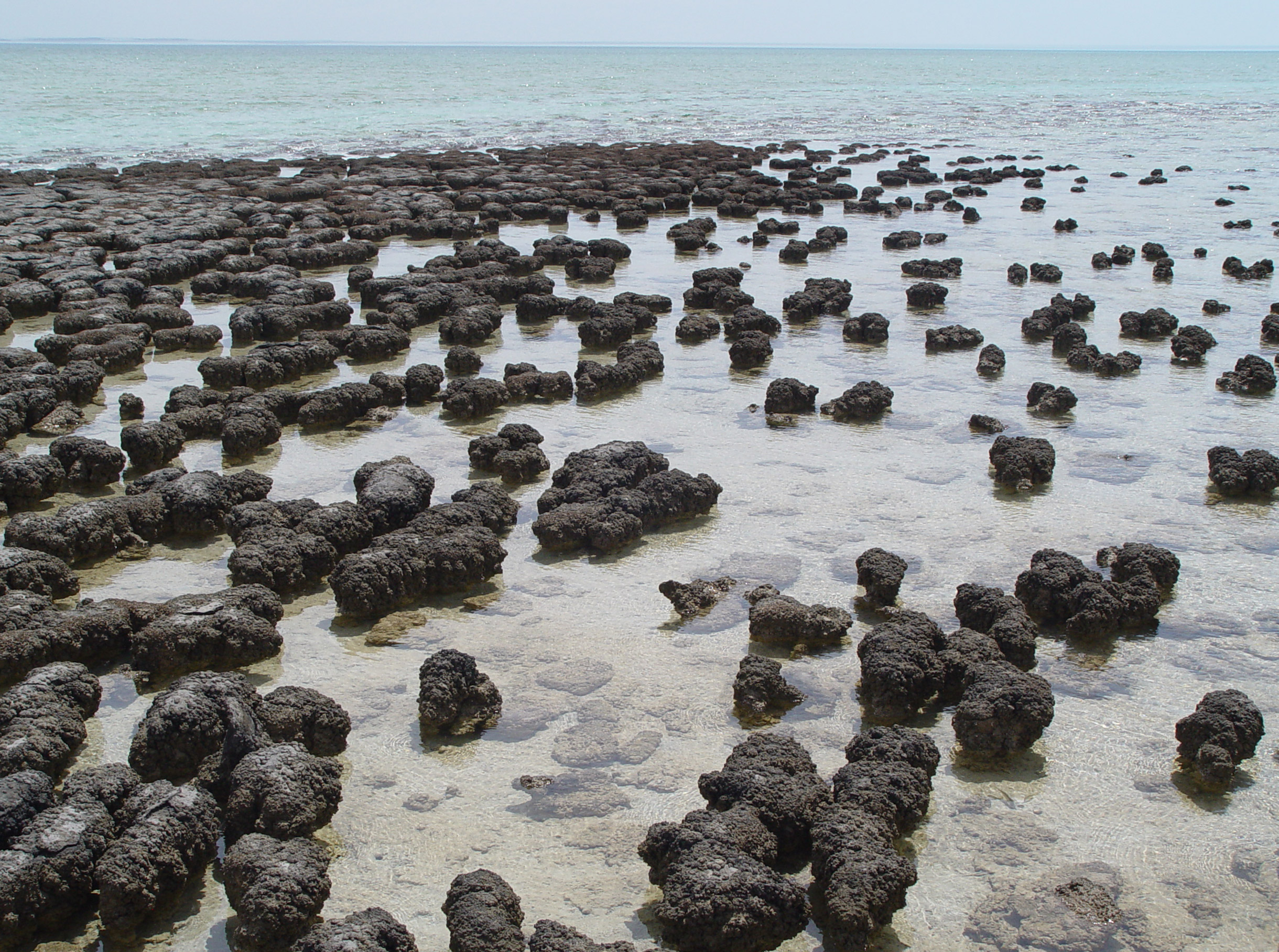
Modern microbialites (stromatolites) in Shark Bay, created by photosynthetic cyanobacteria

Based on evidence from the geologic record, life most likely emerged on Earth between 4.32 and 3.48 Gya. In 2017, the earliest physical evidence of life was reported to consist of microbialites in the Nuvvuagittuq Greenstone Belt of Northern Quebec, in banded iron formation rocks at least 3.77 and possibly as old as 4.32 Gya. The micro-organisms could have lived within hydrothermal vent precipitates, soon after the 4.4 Gya formation of oceans during the Hadean. The microbes resemble modern hydrothermal vent bacteria, supporting the view that abiogenesis began in such an environment. Later research disputed this interpretation of the data, stating that the observations may be better explained by abiotic processes in silica-rich waters, "chemical gardens," circulating hydrothermal fluids, or volcanic ejecta.

Graphite containing carbon isotopes interpreted as biogenic (originating from life) has been found in 3.7 Gya metasedimentary rocks from Akilia Island, southwestern Greenland, near the Isua supracrustal belt. In other parts of the Isua supracrustal belt, graphite inclusions trapped within garnet crystals are connected to the other elements of life: oxygen, nitrogen, and possibly phosphorus in the form of phosphate, providing further evidence for life 3.7 Gya.

Further evidence has been found in microbial mat fossils from 3.49 Gya cherts in the Pilbara region of Western Australia; this provided compelling evidence of early life in pyrite-bearing sandstone in a fossilized beach, with rounded tubular cells that oxidized sulfur by photosynthesis in the absence of oxygen. Carbon isotope ratios on graphite inclusions from the Jack Hills zircons suggest that life could have existed on Earth from 4.1 Gya. The Pilbara region also contains the Dresser Formation with rocks 3.48 Gya, including layered structures called stromatolites. Their modern counterparts are created by photosynthetic micro-organisms including cyanobacteria. These lie within undeformed hydrothermal-sedimentary strata; their texture indicates a biogenic origin. Parts of the Dresser formation preserve hot springs on land, but other regions seem to have been shallow seas.

A molecular clock analysis suggests the LUCA emerged prior to 3.9 Gya. A 2024 study inferred LUCA's age as around 4.2 Gya (4.09–4.33 Gya) by analysing pre-LUCA gene duplicates, with calibration from fossil micro-organisms, much sooner after the origin of life than previously thought.

== Producing molecules: prebiotic synthesis ==
All chemical elements derive from stellar nucleosynthesis except for hydrogen and some helium and lithium. Basic chemical ingredients of life – the carbon–hydrogen molecule (CH), the carbon–hydrogen positive ion (CH+) and the carbon ion (C+) – can be produced by ultraviolet light from stars. Complex molecules, including organic molecules, form naturally both in space and on planets. Organic molecules on the early Earth could have had either terrestrial origins, with organic molecule synthesis driven by impact shocks or by other energy sources, such as ultraviolet light, redox coupling, or electrical discharges; or extraterrestrial origins (pseudo-panspermia), with organic molecules formed in interstellar dust clouds or in the solar nebula accumulating onto the planet.

=== Observed extraterrestrial organic molecules ===
An organic compound is a chemical whose molecules contain carbon. Carbon is abundant in the Sun, stars, comets, and in the atmospheres of most planets of the Solar System. Organic compounds are relatively common in space, formed by "factories of complex molecular synthesis" which occur in molecular clouds and circumstellar envelopes, and chemically evolve after reactions are initiated mostly by ionizing radiation. Purine and pyrimidine nucleobases including guanine, adenine, cytosine, uracil, and thymine, as well as sugars, have been found in meteorites. These could have provided the materials for DNA and RNA to form on the early Earth. The amino acid glycine was found in material ejected from comet Wild 2; it had earlier been detected in meteorites. Comets are encrusted with dark material, thought to be a tar-like organic substance formed from simple carbon compounds under ionizing radiation. A rain of material from comets could have brought such complex organic molecules to Earth. During the Late Heavy Bombardment, meteorites may have delivered up to five million tons of organic prebiotic elements to Earth per year. Currently 40,000 tons of cosmic dust falls to Earth each year.

==== Polycyclic aromatic hydrocarbons ====
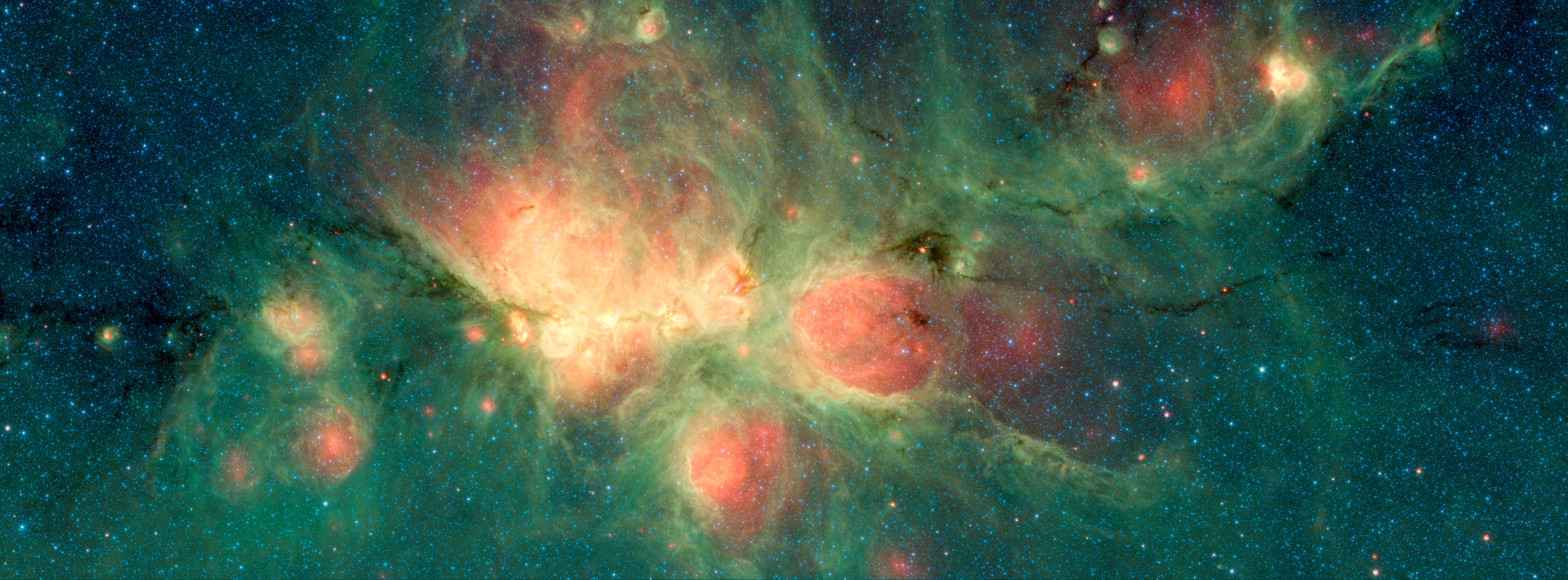
The Cat's Paw Nebula is inside the Milky Way Galaxy, in the constellation Scorpius. Green areas show regions where radiation from hot stars collided with large molecules and small dust grains called "polycyclic aromatic hydrocarbons" (PAHs), causing them to fluoresce. Spitzer Space Telescope, 2018.

Polycyclic aromatic hydrocarbons (PAH) are the most common and abundant polyatomic molecules in the observable universe, and are a major store of carbon. They seem to have formed shortly after the Big Bang, and are associated with new stars and exoplanets. They are a likely constituent of Earth's primordial sea. PAHs have been detected in nebulae, and in the interstellar medium, in comets, and in meteorites.

A star, HH 46-IR, resembling the sun early in its life, is surrounded by a disk of material which contains molecules including cyanide compounds, hydrocarbons, and carbon monoxide. PAHs in the interstellar medium can be transformed through hydrogenation, oxygenation, and hydroxylation to more complex organic compounds used in living cells.

==== Nucleobases and nucleotides ====
Organic compounds introduced on Earth by interstellar dust particles can help to form complex molecules, thanks to their peculiar surface-catalytic activities. The RNA component uracil and related molecules, including xanthine, in the Murchison meteorite were likely formed extraterrestrially, as suggested by studies of ^{12}C/^{13}C isotopic ratios. NASA studies of meteorites suggest that all four DNA nucleobases (adenine, guanine and related organic molecules) have been formed in outer space. The cosmic dust permeating the universe contains complex organics ("amorphous organic solids with a mixed aromatic–aliphatic structure") that could be created rapidly by stars. Glycolaldehyde, a sugar molecule and RNA precursor, has been detected in regions of space including around protostars and on meteorites.

=== Laboratory synthesis ===
As early as the 1860s, experiments demonstrated that biologically relevant molecules can be produced from interaction of simple carbon sources with abundant inorganic catalysts. The spontaneous formation of complex polymers from abiotically generated monomers under the conditions posited by the "soup" theory is not straightforward. Besides the necessary basic organic monomers, compounds that would have prohibited the formation of polymers were also formed in high concentration during the Miller–Urey experiment and Joan Oró experiments. Biology uses essentially 20 amino acids for its coded protein enzymes, representing a very small subset of the structurally possible products. Since life tends to use whatever is available, an explanation is needed for why the set used is so small. Formamide is attractive as a medium that potentially provided a source of amino acid derivatives from simple aldehyde and nitrile feedstocks.

==== Sugars ====
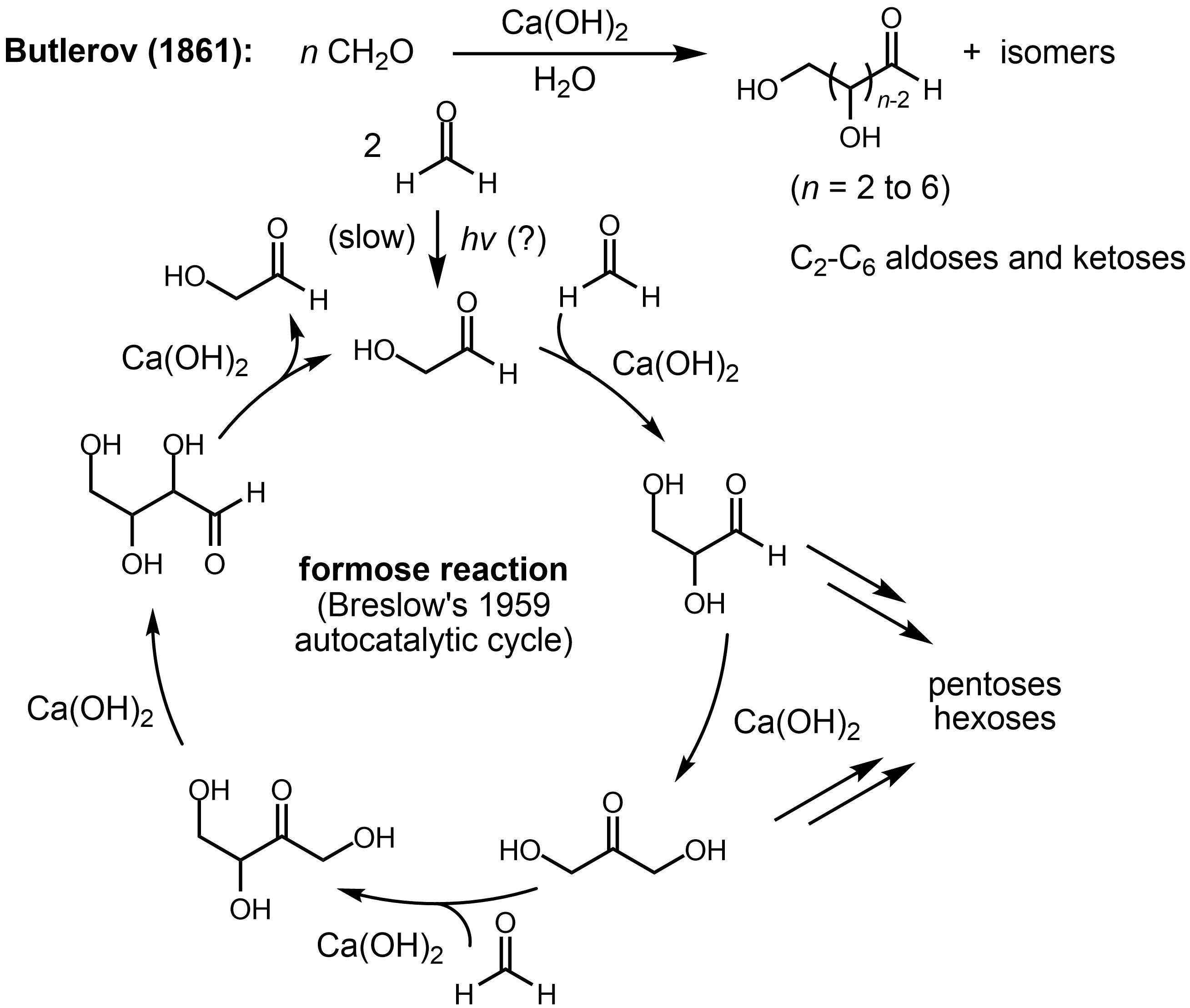
The Breslow catalytic cycle for formaldehyde dimerization and C2-C6 sugar formation

Alexander Butlerov showed in 1861 that the formose reaction created sugars (including tetroses, pentoses, and hexoses) when formaldehyde is heated under basic conditions with divalent metal ions like calcium. In 1959 Ronald Breslow proposed that the reaction was autocatalytic.

==== Nucleobases ====
Nucleobases, such as guanine and adenine, can be synthesized from simple carbon and nitrogen sources, such as hydrogen cyanide (HCN) and ammonia. On early Earth, HCN was likely supplied via photochemical production in a transient, highly reducing atmosphere after major impacts. Formamide, from the reaction of water and HCN, produces all four ribonucleotides when warmed with terrestrial minerals. HCN can contribute to chemical processes such as the synthesis of the amino acid glycine.

DNA and RNA components including uracil, cytosine and thymine can be synthesized under outer space conditions, using starting chemicals such as pyrimidine from meteorites. Pyrimidine may have formed in red giant stars, interstellar dust, or gas clouds, or on Earth via precursors such as cyanoacetylene following asteroid impacts. All four RNA-bases may be synthesized from formamide in high-energy density events like extraterrestrial impacts. Several ribonucleotides for RNA formation have been synthesized in a laboratory environment which replicates prebiotic conditions via autocatalytic formose reaction.

Other pathways for synthesizing bases from inorganic materials have been reported. Freezing temperatures assist the synthesis of purines, by concentrating key precursors such as HCN. However, while adenine and guanine require freezing conditions, cytosine and uracil may require boiling temperatures. Seven amino acids and eleven types of nucleobases formed in ice when ammonia and cyanide were left in a freezer for 25 years. S-triazines (alternative nucleobases), pyrimidines including cytosine and uracil, and adenine can be synthesized by subjecting a urea solution to freeze-thaw cycles under a reductive atmosphere with spark discharges. These low-temperature reactions proceed rapidly due to eutectic freezing, which crowds impurities in microscopic pockets of liquid within the ice.

==== Peptides ====
Prebiotic peptide synthesis could have occurred by several routes. Some center on high temperature/concentration conditions in which condensation becomes energetically favorable, while others use plausible prebiotic condensing agents. The prebiotic synthesis of peptides from simpler molecules such as CO, NH_{3} and C, skipping the step of amino acid formation, is also very efficient.

Wet-dry cycles and the presence of specific salts can greatly increase spontaneous condensation of glycine into poly-glycine chains. Mineral surfaces, such as those of pyrite, calcite, and rutile, can catalyze peptide condensation (creation) but equally accelerates peptide hydrolysis (destruction). However, chemical activation or coupling may be necessary to produce peptides at sufficient concentrations. Thus, mineral surface catalysis is not on its own sufficient for peptide synthesis.

Prebiotically plausible condensing/activating agents include cyanamide, dicyanamide, dicyandiamide, diaminomaleonitrile, urea, trimetaphosphate, NaCl, CuCl_{2,} (Ni,Fe)S, CO, carbonyl sulfide (COS), carbon disulfide (CS_{2})_{,} SO_{2,} and diammonium phosphate (DAP).

A 2024 experiment used a sapphire substrate with a web of thin cracks under a heat flow, mimicking deep-ocean vents, to concentrate prebiotically relevant building blocks from a dilute mixture by up to three orders of magnitude. This could help to create biopolymers such as peptides. A similar role has been suggested for clays, though this speculation has not been supported through experimental evidence.

Up to 25% of random peptide sequences of 65 amino acids expressed in E. coli enhanced the growth rate of their cells, while up to 52% of the sequences inhibited growth. This demonstrated that they can sometimes produce a selective advantage, implying that they can serve useful functions.

== Producing protocells ==
The three main structures composed of phospholipids form spontaneously by self-assembly in solution: the liposome (a closed bilayer), the micelle and the bilayer.

The largest unanswered question in evolution is how simple protocells first arose and differed in reproductive contribution to the following generation, thus initiating evolution. The lipid world theory postulates that the first self-replicating object was lipid-like. Phospholipids form lipid bilayers (as in cell membranes) in water while under agitation. These molecules were not present on early Earth, but other membrane-forming amphiphilic long-chain molecules were. These bodies may expand by insertion of additional lipids, and may spontaneously split into two offspring of similar size and composition. Lipid bodies may have provided sheltering envelopes for information storage, allowing the evolution of information-storing polymers like RNA. Only one or two types of vesicle-forming amphiphiles have been studied. There is an enormous number of possible arrangements of lipid bilayer membranes, and those with the best reproductive characteristics would have converged toward a hypercycle reaction, a positive feedback composed of two mutual catalysts represented by a membrane site and a specific compound trapped in the vesicle. Such site/compound pairs are transmissible to the daughter vesicles, leading to the emergence of distinct lineages of vesicles, subject to natural selection.

A protocell is a self-organized, self-ordered, spherical collection of lipids proposed as a stepping-stone to life, that is capable of evolving. Self-assembled vesicles are essential components of primitive cells. The theory of classical irreversible thermodynamics treats self-assembly under a generalized chemical potential within the framework of dissipative systems. The second law of thermodynamics requires that overall entropy increases, yet life is distinguished by its great degree of organization. Therefore, a boundary is needed to separate ordered life processes from chaotic non-living matter. A functional protocell, which must exhibit Darwinian evolution, has not yet been achieved in a laboratory setting.

Irene Chen and Jack W. Szostak suggest that elementary protocells can give rise to primitive forms of differential reproduction, competition, and energy storage. Competition for membrane molecules would favor stabilized membranes, suggesting a selective advantage for cross-linked fatty acids and even modern phospholipids. Such micro-encapsulation would allow for metabolism within the membrane and the exchange of small molecules, while retaining large biomolecules inside. Such a membrane is needed for a cell to create its own electrochemical gradient. Fatty acid vesicles in alkaline hydrothermal vent conditions can be stabilized by isoprenoids, synthesized by the formose reaction; the advantages and disadvantages of isoprenoids within the lipid bilayer in different microenvironments might have led to the divergence of the membranes of archaea and bacteria.

Vesicles can undergo an evolutionary process under pressure cycling conditions. Simulating the systemic environment in tectonic fault zones within the Earth's crust, pressure cycling forms vesicles periodically, as well as random peptide chains which are selected for ability to integrate into the vesicle membrane. Further selection of vesicles for stability could lead to functional peptide structures, increasing vesicle survival rate.

== Producing biology ==
=== Energy and entropy ===
Life requires a loss of entropy, or disorder, as molecules organize themselves into living matter. At the same time, the emergence of life is associated with the formation of structures beyond a certain threshold of complexity. The emergence of life with increasing order and complexity does not contradict the second law of thermodynamics, which states that overall entropy never decreases, since a living organism creates order in some places (e.g. its living body) at the expense of an increase of entropy elsewhere (e.g. heat and waste production).

Multiple sources of energy were available for chemical reactions on the early Earth. Heat from geothermal processes is a standard energy source for chemistry. Other examples include sunlight, lightning, atmospheric entries of micro-meteorites, and implosion of bubbles in sea and ocean waves. This has been confirmed by experiments and simulations. Unfavorable reactions can be driven by highly favorable ones, as in the case of iron-sulfur chemistry. For example, this was probably important for carbon fixation. (Note: The reactions are: FeS + H_{2}S → FeS_{2} + 2H^{+} + 2e^{−} FeS + H_{2}S + CO_{2} → FeS_{2} + HCOOH) Carbon fixation by reaction of CO_{2} with H_{2}S via iron-sulfur chemistry is favorable, and occurs at neutral pH and 100 °C. Iron-sulfur surfaces, which are abundant near hydrothermal vents, can drive the production of small amounts of amino acids and other biomolecules.

=== Chemiosmosis ===
ATP synthase uses the chemiosmotic proton gradient to power ATP synthesis through oxidative phosphorylation.

In 1961, Peter Mitchell proposed chemiosmosis as a cell's primary system of energy conversion. The mechanism, now ubiquitous in living cells, powers energy conversion in micro-organisms and in the mitochondria of eukaryotes, making it a likely candidate for early life. Mitochondria produce adenosine triphosphate (ATP), the energy currency of the cell used to drive cellular processes such as chemical syntheses. The mechanism of ATP synthesis involves a closed membrane in which the ATP synthase enzyme is embedded. The energy required to release strongly bound ATP has its origin in protons that move across the membrane. In modern cells, those proton movements are caused by the pumping of ions across the membrane, maintaining an electrochemical gradient. In the first organisms, the gradient could have been provided by the difference in chemical composition between the flow from a hydrothermal vent and the surrounding seawater, or perhaps meteoric quinones that were conducive to the development of chemiosmotic energy across lipid membranes if at a terrestrial origin.

Chemiosmotic coupling in the membranes of a mitochondrion

=== PAH world hypothesis ===
The PAH world hypothesis is a speculative hypothesis that proposes that polycyclic aromatic hydrocarbons (PAHs), known to be abundant in the universe, including in comets, and assumed to be abundant in the primordial soup of the early Earth, played a major role in the origin of life by mediating the synthesis of RNA molecules, leading into the RNA world. However, as yet, the hypothesis is untested.

=== The RNA world ===
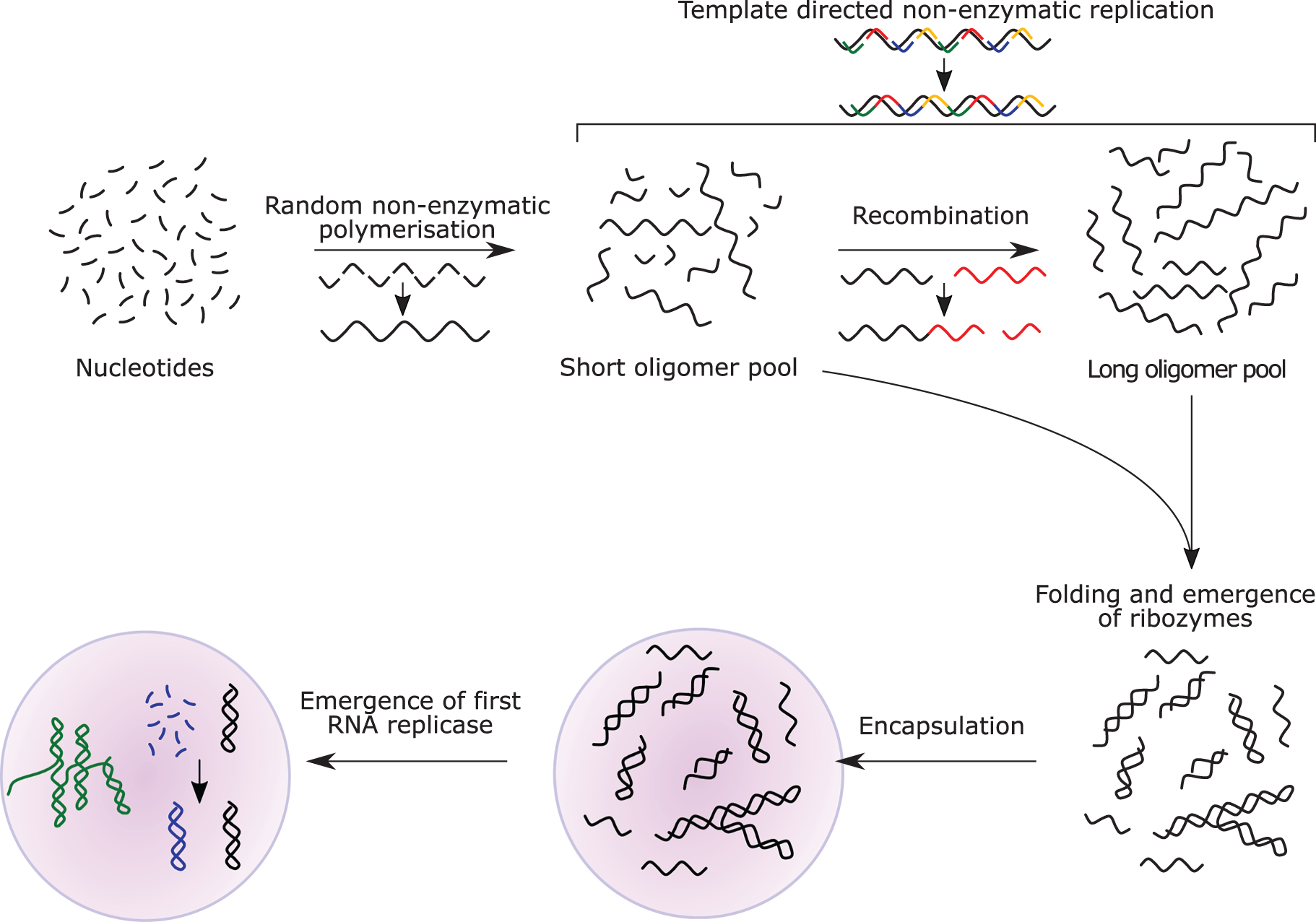
The RNA world hypothesis proposes that undirected polymerisation led to the emergence of ribozymes, and in turn to an RNA replicase.

The RNA world hypothesis describes an early Earth with self-replicating and catalytic RNA but no DNA or proteins. It was proposed in 1962 by Alexander Rich; the term was coined by Walter Gilbert in 1986. Many researchers concur that an RNA world must have preceded modern DNA-based life. However, it may not have been the first to exist. There may have been over 30 chemical events between pre-RNA world to near-LUCA, just involving RNA.

RNA is central to the translation process. Small RNAs can catalyze all the transfers of chemical groups and information required for life. RNA both expresses and maintains genetic information in modern organisms; its components are easily synthesized under early Earth conditions. The structure of the ribosome has been called the "smoking gun", with a central core of RNA and no amino acid side chains within 18 Å of the active site that catalyzes peptide bond formation.

RNA replicase can both code and catalyse further RNA replication, i.e. it is autocatalytic. Some catalytic RNAs can link smaller RNA sequences together, enabling self-replication. Natural selection would then favor the proliferation of such autocatalytic sets. Self-assembly of RNA may occur spontaneously in hydrothermal vents. A preliminary form of tRNA could have assembled into a replicator molecule. When this began to replicate, it may have had all three mechanisms of Darwinian selection: heritability, variation, and differential reproduction. Its fitness would have depended on its ability to adapt, determined by its nucleotide sequence, and resource availability.

=== Phylogeny and LUCA ===
Starting with the work of Carl Woese from 1977, genomics studies have placed the last universal common ancestor (LUCA) of all modern life-forms between Bacteria and a clade formed by Archaea and Eukaryota in the phylogenetic tree of life. It lived over 4.2 Gya. A minority of studies have placed the LUCA in Bacteria, proposing that Archaea and Eukaryota are evolutionarily derived from within Eubacteria; Thomas Cavalier-Smith suggested in 2006 that the phenotypically diverse bacterial phylum Chloroflexota contained the LUCA.

Phylogenetic tree showing the last universal common ancestor (LUCA) at the root. The major clades are the Bacteria on one hand, and the Archaea and Eukaryota on the other.

In 2016, a set of 355 genes likely present in the LUCA was identified. A total of 6.1 million prokaryotic genes from Bacteria and Archaea were sequenced, identifying 355 protein clusters from among 286,514 protein clusters that were probably common to the LUCA. The results suggest that the LUCA was anaerobic with a Wood–Ljungdahl (reductive Acetyl-CoA) pathway, nitrogen- and carbon-fixing, thermophilic. Its cofactors suggest dependence upon an environment rich in hydrogen, carbon dioxide, iron, and transition metals. Its genetic material was probably DNA, requiring the 4-nucleotide genetic code, messenger RNA, transfer RNA, and ribosomes to translate the code into proteins such as enzymes. LUCA likely inhabited an anaerobic hydrothermal vent setting in a geochemically active environment. It was evidently already a complex organism, and must have had precursors; it was not the first living thing. The physiology of LUCA has been in dispute. Previous research identified 60 proteins common to all life. Metabolic reactions inferred in LUCA are the incomplete reverse Krebs cycle, gluconeogenesis, the pentose phosphate pathway, glycolysis, reductive amination, and transamination.

LUCA systems and environment included the Wood–Ljungdahl pathway.

== Suitable geological environments ==
A variety of geologic and environmental settings have been proposed for an origin of life. These theories are often in competition with one another as there are many views of prebiotic compound availability, geophysical setting, and early life characteristics. The first organism on Earth likely differed from LUCA. Between the first appearance of life and where all modern phylogenies began branching, an unknown amount of time passed, with unknown gene transfers, extinctions, and adaptation to environmental niches. Modern phylogenies provide more genetic evidence about LUCA than about its precursors.

=== Deep sea hydrothermal vents ===
==== Hot fluids ====
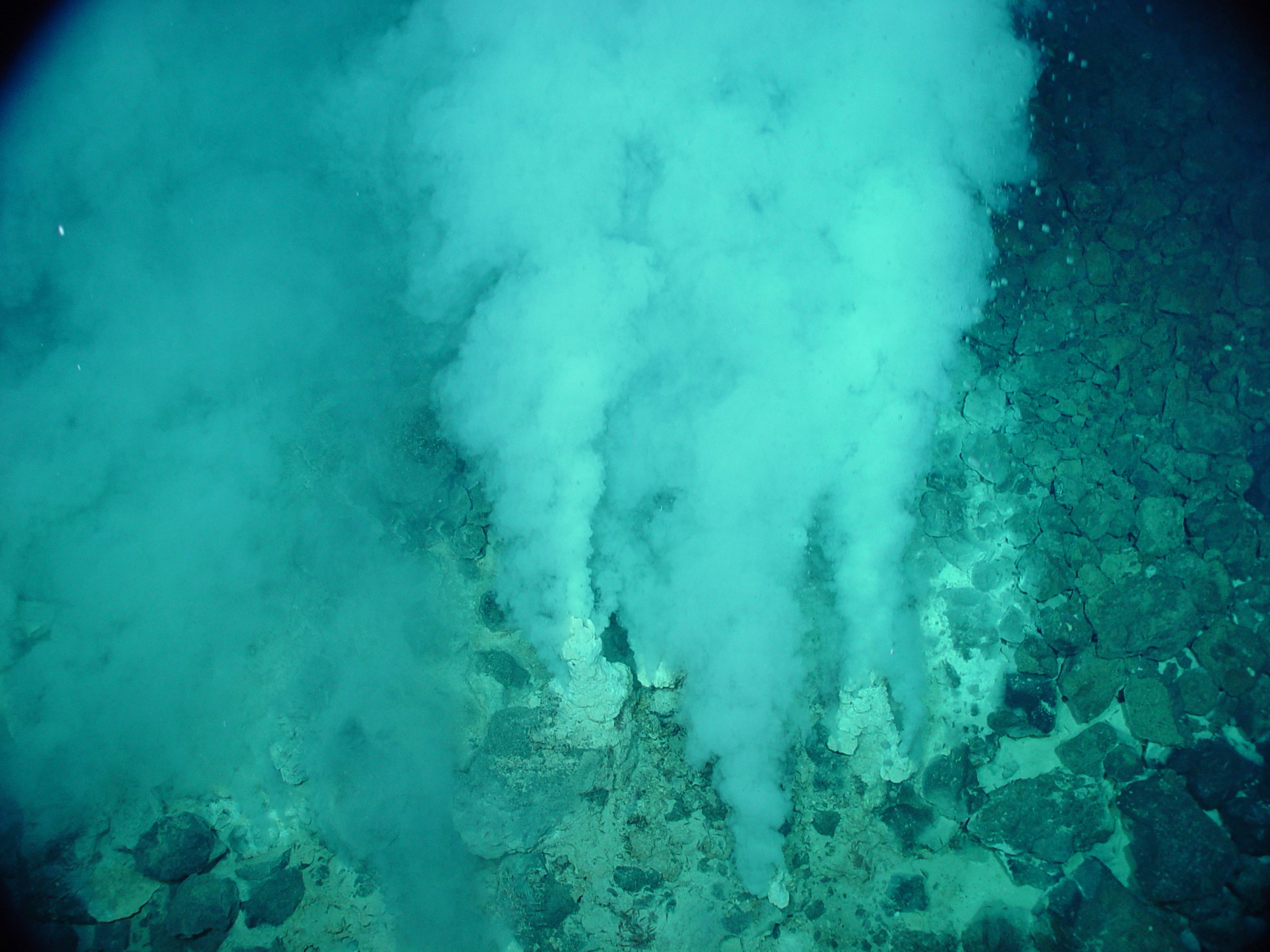
The earliest known life forms may be putative fossilized microorganisms, found in white smoker hydrothermal vent precipitates. They may have lived as early as 4.28 Gya (billion years ago), relatively soon after the formation of the oceans 4.41 Gya, not long after the formation of the Earth 4.54 Gya.

Early micro-fossils may have come from a hot world of gases such as methane, ammonia, carbon dioxide, and hydrogen sulfide, toxic to much current life. Analysis of the tree of life places thermophilic and hyperthermophilic bacteria and archaea closest to the root, suggesting that life may have evolved in a hot environment. The deep sea or alkaline hydrothermal vent theory posits that life began at submarine hydrothermal vents. William Martin and Michael Russell have suggested that this could have been in metal-sulphide-walled compartments acting as precursors for cell walls.

These form where hydrogen-rich fluids emerge from below the sea floor, as a result of serpentinization of ultra-mafic olivine with seawater and a pH interface with carbon dioxide-rich ocean water. The vents form a sustained chemical energy source derived from redox reactions, in which electron donors (molecular hydrogen) react with electron acceptors (carbon dioxide); see iron–sulfur world theory. These are exothermic reactions. (Note: The reactions are: Reaction 1: Fayalite + water → magnetite + aqueous silica + hydrogen 3Fe_{2}SiO_{4} + 2H_{2}O → 2Fe_{3}O_{4} + 3SiO_{2} + 2H_{2} Reaction 2: Forsterite + aqueous silica → serpentine 3Mg_{2}SiO_{4} + SiO_{2} + 4H_{2}O → 2Mg_{3}Si_{2}O_{5}(OH)_{4} Reaction 3: Forsterite + water → serpentine + brucite 2Mg_{2}SiO_{4} + 3H_{2}O → Mg_{3}Si_{2}O_{5}(OH)_{4} + Mg(OH)_{2} Reaction 3 describes the hydration of olivine with water only to yield serpentine and Mg(OH)_{2} (brucite). Serpentine is stable at high pH in the presence of brucite like calcium silicate hydrate, (C-S-H) phases formed along with portlandite (Ca(OH)_{2}) in hardened Portland cement paste after the hydration of belite (Ca_{2}SiO_{4}), the artificial calcium equivalent of forsterite. Analogy of reaction 3 with belite hydration in ordinary Portland cement: Belite + water → C-S-H phase + portlandite 2 Ca_{2}SiO_{4} + 4 H_{2}O → 3 CaO · 2 SiO_{2} · 3 H_{2}O + Ca(OH)_{2})

==== Chemiosmotic gradient ====
Proposed model of an early cell powered by external proton gradient near a deep-sea hydrothermal vent. As long as the membrane (or passive ion channels within it) is permeable to protons, the mechanism can function without ion pumps.

Russell demonstrated that alkaline vents create an abiogenic proton motive force chemiosmotic gradient, ideal for abiogenesis. Their microscopic compartments "provide a natural means of concentrating organic molecules," composed of iron-sulfur minerals such as mackinawite, endowed these mineral cells with the catalytic properties envisaged by Günter Wächtershäuser. This movement of ions across the membrane depends on two factors:

1. Diffusion force caused by concentration gradient—all particles including ions diffuse from higher concentration to lower.
2. Electrostatic force caused by electrical potential gradient—cations like protons H^{+} diffuse down the electrical potential, anions in the opposite direction.

These two gradients together can be expressed as an electrochemical gradient, providing energy for abiogenic synthesis. The proton motive force measures the potential energy stored as proton and voltage gradients across a membrane (differences in proton concentration and electrical potential).

The surfaces of mineral particles inside deep-ocean hydrothermal vents have catalytic properties similar to those of enzymes, and can create simple organic molecules, such as methanol (CH_{3}OH) and formic, acetic, and pyruvic acids out of the dissolved CO_{2} in the water, if driven by an applied voltage or by reaction with H_{2} or H_{2}S.

Starting in 1981, researchers proposed that life might have started at hydrothermal vents, that spontaneous chemistry in the Earth's crust driven by rock–water interactions at disequilibrium thermodynamically underpinned life's origin, and that the founding lineages of the archaea and bacteria were H_{2}-dependent autotrophs that used CO_{2} as their terminal acceptor in energy metabolism. In 2016, Martin suggested that the LUCA "may have depended heavily on the geothermal energy of the vent to survive". That same year, RNA was produced in synthetic alkaline hydrothermal chimneys simulating deep-sea vents. Researchers were able to generate RNA oligomers of up to 4 units in length. This RNA was synthesized using activated ribonucleotides. Additionally, these RNA oligomers could only be synthesized under certain conditions.

Pores at deep sea hydrothermal vents are suggested to have been occupied by membrane-bound compartments which promoted biochemical reactions. Metabolic intermediates in the Krebs cycle, gluconeogenesis, amino acid bio-synthetic pathways, glycolysis, the pentose phosphate pathway, and including sugars like ribose, and lipid precursors can occur non-enzymatically at conditions relevant to deep-sea alkaline hydrothermal vents.

If the deep marine hydrothermal setting was the site, then life could have arisen as early as 4.0–4.2 Gya. If life evolved in the ocean at depths of more than ten meters, it would have been shielded both from impacts and the then high levels of solar ultraviolet radiation. The available energy in hydrothermal vents is maximized at 100–150 °C, the temperatures at which hyperthermophilic bacteria and thermoacidophilic archaea live.

==== Arguments against a vent setting ====
Hyperthermophily could have been a result of convergent evolution in bacteria and archaea; a mesophilic environment has been called more likely.

Production of prebiotic organic compounds at hydrothermal vents is estimated to be 10^{8} kg/yr. Key prebiotic compounds, such as methane are in far lower concentrations at vents than in a Miller-Urey Experiment environment. Some organic compounds are now understood to have been formed by other geological processes and inherited by vents. Methane, for example, more likely comes from leached fluid inclusions formed deeper in oceanic crust from magmatic carbon.

Vents do not concentrate prebiotic materials, due to strong dilution by seawater. This open system cycles compounds through vent minerals, leaving little residence time to accumulate. All modern cells rely on phosphates for nucleotide backbone and potassium for protein formation, making it likely that the first life forms shared these functions. These elements were not available in high quantities in the Archaean oceans. However, phosphate can be concentrated in lakes, as in the modern Last Chance Lake. Submarine hydrothermal vents are not conducive to condensation reactions to polymerise macromolecules.

An older argument was that key polymers were encapsulated in vesicles after condensation, which supposedly would not happen in saltwater. However, while salinity inhibits vesicle formation from low-diversity mixtures of fatty acids, vesicle formation from a broader, more realistic mix of fatty-acid and 1-alkanol species is more resilient.

No studies have been able to experimentally demonstrate synthesis of sugars, amino acids, nucleases, nucleosides, nucleotides, or membrane-forming fatty acids under plausible vent conditions.

=== Surface bodies of water ===
Surface bodies of water provide environments that dry out and rewet. Wet-dry cycles concentrate prebiotic compounds and enable condensation reactions to polymerise macromolecules. Moreover, lakes and ponds receive detrital input from weathering of continental apatite-containing rocks, the most common source of phosphates. The amount of exposed continental crust in the Hadean is unknown, but models of early ocean depths and rates of ocean island and continental crust growth make it plausible that there was exposed land. Another line of evidence for a surface start to life is the requirement for Ultraviolet radiation (UV) for organism function. UV is necessary for the formation of the U+C nucleotide base pair by partial hydrolysis and nucleobase loss. Simultaneously, UV can be harmful and sterilising to life, especially for simple early lifeforms with little ability to repair radiation damage. Radiation levels from a young Sun were likely greater, and, with no ozone layer, harmful shortwave UV rays would reach the surface of Earth. For life to begin, a shielded environment with influx from UV-exposed sources is necessary to both benefit and protect from UV. Shielding under ice, liquid water, mineral surfaces (e.g. clay) or regolith is possible in a range of surface water settings.

==== Hot springs ====
Most branching phylogenies are thermophilic or hyperthermophilic, making it possible that LUCA and preceding lifeforms were similarly thermophilic. Hot springs are formed from the heating of groundwater by geothermal activity. This intersection allows for influxes of material from deep penetrating waters and from surface runoff that transports eroded continental sediments. Interconnected groundwater systems create a mechanism for distribution of life to wider area.

Mulkidjanian and co-authors argue that marine environments did not provide the ionic balance and composition universally found in cells, or the ions required by essential proteins and ribozymes, especially with respect to high K^{+}/Na^{+} ratio, Mn^{2+}, Zn^{2+} and phosphate concentrations. They argue that the only environments that do this are hot springs similar to ones at Kamchatka. Mineral deposits in these environments under an anoxic atmosphere would have suitable pH, contain precipitates of photocatalytic sulfide minerals that absorb harmful ultraviolet radiation, and have wet-dry cycles that concentrate substrate solutions enough for spontaneous formation of biopolymers created both by chemical reactions in the hydrothermal environment, and by exposure to UV light during transport from vents to adjacent pools. The hypothesized pre-biotic environments are similar to hydrothermal vents, with additional components that help explain peculiarities of the LUCA.

A phylogenomic and geochemical analysis of proteins plausibly traced to the LUCA shows that the ionic composition of its intracellular fluid is identical to that of hot springs. The LUCA likely was dependent upon synthesized organic matter for its growth. Experiments show that RNA-like polymers can be synthesized in wet-dry cycling and UV light exposure. These polymers were encapsulated in vesicles after condensation. Potential sources of organics at hot springs might have been transported by interplanetary dust particles, extraterrestrial projectiles, or atmospheric or geochemical synthesis. Hot springs could have been abundant in volcanic landmasses during the Hadean.

==== Temperate surface bodies of water ====
A mesophilic start in surface bodies of waters hypothesis has evolved from Darwin's concept of a 'warm little pond' and the Oparin-Haldane hypothesis. Freshwater bodies under temperate climates can accumulate prebiotic materials while providing suitable environmental conditions conducive to simple life forms. The Archaean climate is uncertain. Atmospheric reconstructions from geochemical proxies and models suggest that sufficient greenhouse gases were present to maintain surface temperatures between 0–40 °C. If so, the temperature was suitable for life to begin.

Evidence for mesophily from biomolecular studies includes Galtier's G+C nucleotide thermometer. G+C are more abundant in thermophiles due to the added stability of an additional hydrogen bond not present between A+T nucleotides. rRNA sequencing of modern lifeforms shows that LUCA's reconstructed G+C content was likely representative of moderate temperatures.

The diversity of thermophiles today could be a product of convergent evolution and horizontal gene transfer rather than an inherited trait from LUCA. The reverse gyrase topoisomerase is found exclusively in thermophiles and hyperthermophiles, as it allows for coiling of DNA. This enzyme requires the complex molecule ATP to function. If an origin of life is hypothesised to involve a simple organism that had not yet evolved a membrane, let alone ATP, this would make the existence of reverse gyrase improbable. Moreover, phylogenetic studies show that reverse gyrase originated in archaea, and transferred to bacteria by horizontal gene transfer, implying it was not present in the LUCA.

==== Icy surface bodies of water ====
Cold-start theories presuppose large ice-covered regions. Stellar evolution models predict that the Sun's luminosity was ≈25% weaker than it is today. Fuelner states that although this significant decrease in solar energy would have formed an icy planet, there is strong evidence for the presence of liquid water, possibly driven by a greenhouse effect. This would mean an early Earth with both liquid oceans and icy poles.

Ice melts that form from ice sheets or glacier melts create freshwater pools, another niche capable of wet-dry cycles. While surface pools would be exposed to intense UV radiation, bodies of water within and under ice would be shielded, while remaining connected to exposed areas through ice cracks. Impact melting would allow freshwater and meteoritic input, creating prebiotic components. Near-seawater levels of sodium chloride destabilize fatty acid membrane self-assembly, making freshwater settings appealing for early membranous life.

Icy environments would trade the faster reaction rates that occur in warm environments for increased stability and accumulation of larger polymers. Experiments simulating Europa-like conditions of ≈20 °C have synthesised amino acids and adenine, showing that Miller-Urey type syntheses can occur at low temperatures. In an RNA world, the ribozyme would have had even more functions than in a later DNA-RNA-protein-world. For RNA to function, it must be able to fold, a process hindered by temperatures above 30 °C. While RNA folding in psychrophilic organisms is slower, so is hydrolysis, so folding is more successful. Shorter nucleotides would not suffer from higher temperatures.

=== Inside the continental crust ===
The continental crust, with tectonic fault zones could present a stable and well-protected environment for long-term prebiotic evolution. Inside these systems of cracks and cavities, water and carbon dioxide present the bulk solvents. Their phase state could vary between liquid, gaseous and supercritical, depending on pressure and temperature. When forming two separate phases, the system provides optimal conditions for phase transfer reactions. Concurrently, the contents of the tectonic fault zones are supplied with inorganic educts (e.g. carbon monoxide, hydrogen, ammonia, hydrogen cyanide, nitrogen, and phosphate) and simple organic molecules (e.g. amino acids, long-chain amines, fatty acids, long-chain aldehydes).

Part of the tectonic fault zones is at a depth of around 1000 m. For carbon dioxide, it provides temperature and pressure conditions near the phase transition point between the supercritical and the gaseous state. This allows lipophilic organic molecules that dissolve well in supercritical CO_{2} to accumulate, leading to local precipitation. Periodic pressure variations such as caused by geysers or tidal influences result in periodic phase transitions, keeping the local reaction environment in a constant non-equilibrium state. In presence of amphiphilic compounds (such as the long chain amines and fatty acids), subsequent generations of vesicles are formed that are selected for their stability.

== Homochirality ==
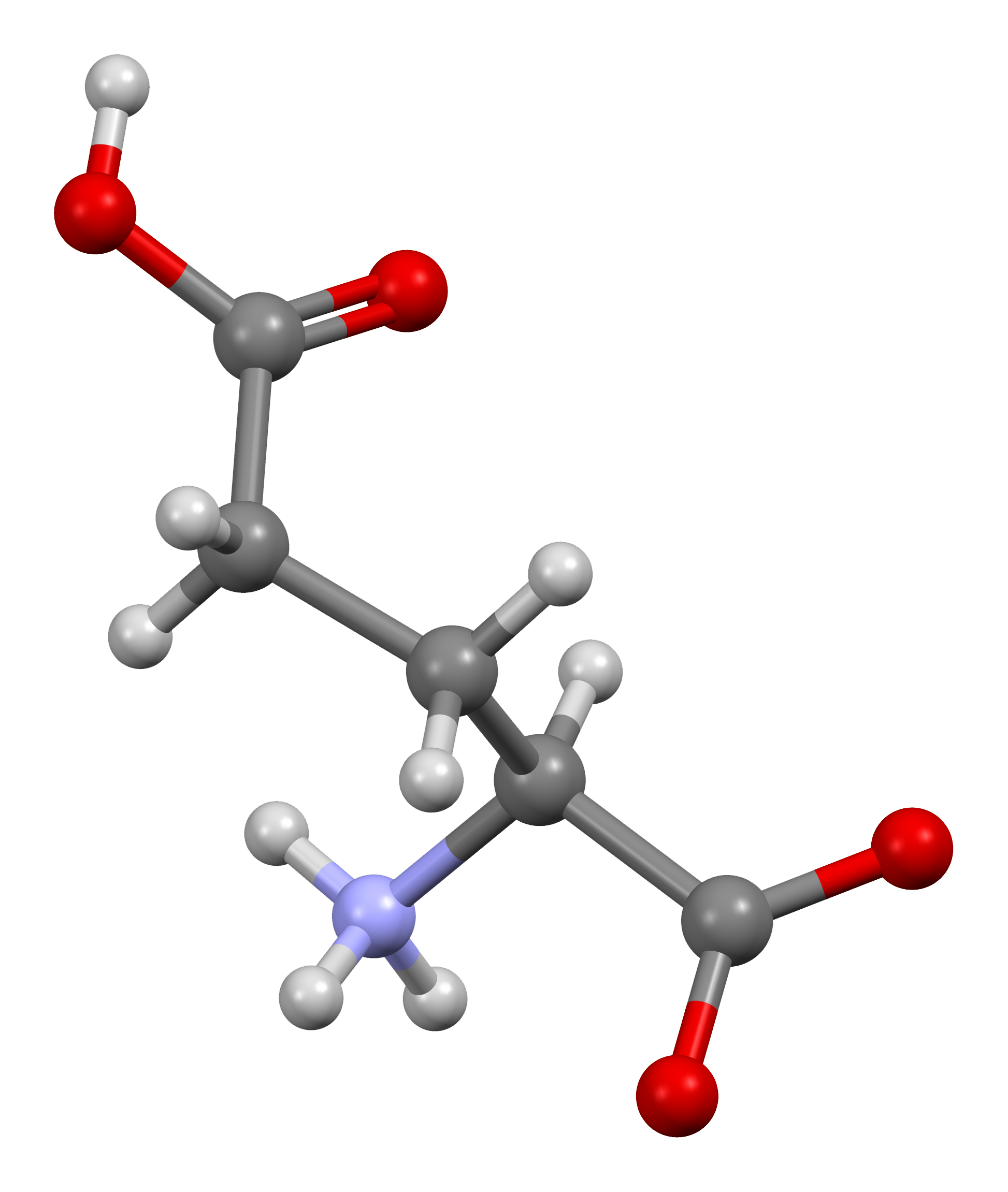
Many biomolecules, such as L-glutamic acid, are asymmetric, and occur in living systems in only one of the two possible forms, in the case of amino acids the left-handed form. Prebiotic chemistry would produce both forms, creating a puzzle for abiogenesis researchers.

Homochirality is the uniformity of materials composed of chiral (non-mirror-symmetric) units. Living organisms use molecules with the same chirality: with almost no exceptions, amino acids are left-handed while nucleotides and sugars are right-handed. Chiral molecules can be synthesized, but in the absence of a chiral source or a chiral catalyst, they are formed in a 50/50 (racemic) mixture of both forms. Non-racemic mixtures can arise from racemic materials by asymmetric physical laws such as the electroweak interaction, or in asymmetric environments, such as those in which molecules are exposed to circularly polarized light of a given handedness. It has been hypothesized that the solar nebula was such an environment, exposed to circularly-polarized radiation from an external source before or during the epoch of planet formation. This proposal is consistent with the finding that some amino acids delivered to Earth in meteorites exhibit a chiral asymmetry of the same sign as terrestrial life.

Once established, a chirality imbalance may influence subsequent chemical evolution. A small bias in the population can be amplified by asymmetric autocatalysis, as in the Soai reaction, where a chiral molecule catalyzes its own production.

== See also ==
- Alternative abiogenesis scenarios – Proposed alternative scenarios related to abiogenesis
- Autopoiesis – System capable of producing itself
- Formamide-based prebiotic chemistry – Scientific hypothesis that life originated from formamide precursors
- Proto-metabolism – Chemical reactions which turn into modern metabolism
- GADV-protein world hypothesis – Hypothetical stage of abiogenesis
- Genetic recombination – Shuffling of genetic material
- Shadow biosphere – Hypothetical biosphere of Earth
- Manganese metallic nodules – Mineral concretion found on the sea bottom
- Virus world hypothesis – Theory that viruses predate cellular life

== Sources ==
- Altermann, Wladyslaw (2009). "Introduction: A Roadmap to Fata Morgana?". In Seckbach, Joseph; Walsh, Maud (eds.). From Fossils to Astrobiology: Records of Life on Earth and the Search for Extraterrestrial Biosignatures. Cellular Origin, Life in Extreme Habitats and Astrobiology. Vol. 12. Dordrecht, the Netherlands; London: Springer. ISBN 978-1-4020-8836-0.
- Bada, Jeffrey L.; Lazcano, Antonio (2009). "The Origin of Life". In Ruse, Michael; Travis, Joseph (eds.). Evolution: The First Four Billion Years. Foreword by Edward O. Wilson. Cambridge: Belknap Press of Harvard University Press. ISBN 978-0-674-03175-3. OCLC 225874308.
- Barton, Nicholas H.; Briggs, Derek E.G.; Eisen, Jonathan A.; et al. (2007). Evolution. Cold Spring Harbor, New York: Cold Spring Harbor Laboratory Press. ISBN 978-0-87969-684-9. OCLC 86090399.
- Bastian, H. Charlton (1871). The Modes of Origin of Lowest Organisms. London; New York: Macmillan and Company. OCLC 42959303.
- Bernal, J. D. (1951). The Physical Basis of Life. London: Routledge & Kegan Paul.
- Bernal, J. D. (1960). "The Problem of Stages in Biopoesis". In Florkin, M. (ed.). Aspects of the Origin of Life. International Series of Monographs on Pure and Applied Biology. Oxford, UK; New York: Pergamon Press.
- Bernal, J. D. (1967) [Reprinted work by A.I. Oparin originally published 1924; Moscow: The Moscow Worker]. The Origin of Life. The Weidenfeld and Nicolson Natural History. Translation of Oparin by Ann Synge. London: Weidenfeld & Nicolson.
- Bock, Gregory R.; Goode, Jamie A., eds. (1996). Evolution of Hydrothermal Ecosystems on Earth (and Mars?). Ciba Foundation Symposium. Vol. 202. Chichester, UK; New York: John Wiley & Sons. ISBN 978-0-471-96509-1.
- Bondeson, Jan (1999). The Feejee Mermaid and Other Essays in Natural and Unnatural History. Ithaca, NY: Cornell University Press. ISBN 978-0-8014-3609-3.
- Bryson, Bill (2004). A Short History of Nearly Everything. London: Black Swan. ISBN 978-0-552-99704-1. OCLC 55589795.
- Calvin, Melvin (1969). Chemical Evolution: Molecular Evolution Towards the Origin of Living Systems on the Earth and Elsewhere. Oxford, UK: Clarendon Press. ISBN 978-0-19-855342-7. OCLC 25220.
- Chaichian, Masud; Rojas, Hugo Perez; Tureanu, Anca (2014). "Physics and Life". Basic Concepts in Physics. Undergraduate Lecture Notes in Physics. Berlin; Heidelberg: Springer Berlin Heidelberg. pp. 353–364. doi:10.1007/978-3-642-19598-3_12. ISBN 978-3-642-19597-6. OCLC 900189038. S2CID 115247432.
- Chang, Thomas Ming Swi (2007). Artificial Cells: Biotechnology, Nanomedicine, Regenerative Medicine, Blood Substitutes, Bioencapsulation, and Cell/Stem Cell Therapy. Regenerative Medicine, Artificial Cells and Nanomedicine. Vol. 1. Hackensack, New Jersey: World Scientific. ISBN 978-981-270-576-1. OCLC 173522612.
- Dalrymple, G. Brent (2001). "The age of the Earth in the twentieth century: a problem (mostly) solved". In Lewis, C. L. E.; Knell, S. J. (eds.). The Age of the Earth: from 4004 BC to AD 2002. Geological Society Special Publication. Vol. 190. London: Geological Society of London. pp. 205–221. Bibcode:2001GSLSP.190..205D. doi:10.1144/gsl.sp.2001.190.01.14. ISBN 978-1-86239-093-5. OCLC 48570033. S2CID 130092094.
- Darwin, Charles (1887). Darwin, Francis (ed.). The Life and Letters of Charles Darwin, Including an Autobiographical Chapter. Vol. 3 (3rd ed.). London: John Murray. OCLC 834491774.
- Davies, Paul (1999). The Fifth Miracle: The Search for the Origin of Life. London: Penguin Books. ISBN 978-0-14-028226-9.
- Dobell, Clifford (1960) [Originally published 1932; New York: Harcourt, Brace & Company]. Antony van Leeuwenhoek and His 'Little Animals'. New York: Dover Publications.
- Dyson, Freeman (1999). Origins of Life (Revised ed.). Cambridge, UK; New York: Cambridge University Press. ISBN 978-0-521-62668-2.
- Fesenkov, V. G. (1959). "Some Considerations about the Primaeval State of the Earth". In Oparin, A. I.; et al. (eds.). The Origin of Life on the Earth. I.U.B. Symposium Series. Vol. 1. Edited for the International Union of Biochemistry by Frank Clark and R.L.M. Synge (English-French-German ed.). London; New York: Pergamon Press. International Symposium on the Origin of Life on the Earth (held at Moscow, 19–24 August 1957)
- Hazen, Robert M. (2005). Genesis: The Scientific Quest for Life's Origin. Washington, DC: Joseph Henry Press. ISBN 978-0-309-09432-0. OCLC 60321860.
- Huxley, Thomas Henry (1968) [1897]. "VIII Biogenesis and Abiogenesis [1870]". Discourses, Biological and Geological. Collected Essays. Vol. VIII (Reprint ed.). New York: Greenwood Press. OCLC 476737627. Archived from the original on 7 May 2015.
- Klyce, Brig (22 January 2001). Kingsley, Stuart A.; Bhathal, Ragbir (eds.). Panspermia Asks New Questions. The Search for Extraterrestrial Intelligence (SETI) in the Optical Spectrum III. Vol. 4273. Bellingham, WA: SPIE. doi:10.1117/12.435366. ISBN 0-8194-3951-7. Archived from the original on 3 September 2013. Proceedings of the SPIE held at San Jose, California, 22–24 January 2001
- Lane, Nick (2009). Life Ascending: The 10 Great Inventions of Evolution (1st American ed.). New York: W.W. Norton & Company. ISBN 978-0-393-06596-1. OCLC 286488326.
- Lennox, James G. (2001). Aristotle's Philosophy of Biology: Studies in the Origins of Life Science. Cambridge Studies in Philosophy and Biology. Cambridge, UK; New York: Cambridge University Press. ISBN 978-0-521-65976-5.
- Michod, Richard E. (1999). Darwinian Dynamics: Evolutionary Transitions in Fitness and Individuality. Princeton, New Jersey: Princeton University Press. ISBN 978-0-691-02699-2. OCLC 38948118.
- Oparin, A.I. (1953) [Originally published 1938; New York: The Macmillan Company]. The Origin of Life. Translation and new introduction by Sergius Morgulis (2nd ed.). Mineola, NY: Dover Publications.
- Ross, Alexander (1652). Arcana Microcosmi. Vol. II. London. OCLC 614453394. Archived from the original on 24 February 2024.
- Sheldon, Robert B. (22 September 2005). "Historical Development of the Distinction between Bio- and Abiogenesis" (PDF). In Hoover, Richard B.; Levin, Gilbert V.; Rozanov, Alexei Y.; Gladstone, G. Randall (eds.). Astrobiology and Planetary Missions. Vol. 5906. Bellingham, WA: SPIE. pp. 59061I. doi:10.1117/12.663480. ISBN 978-0-8194-5911-4. Archived (PDF) from the original on 13 April 2015. Proceedings of the SPIE held at San Diego, California, 31 July–2 August 2005
- Tyndall, John (1905) [Originally published 1871; London; New York: Longmans, Green & Co.; D. Appleton and Company]. Fragments of Science. Vol. 2 (6th ed.). New York: P.F. Collier & Sons. OCLC 726998155.
- Voet, Donald; Voet, Judith G. (2004). Biochemistry. Vol. 1 (3rd ed.). New York: John Wiley & Sons. ISBN 978-0-471-19350-0.
- Yarus, Michael (2010). Life from an RNA World: The Ancestor Within. Cambridge, Massachusetts: Harvard University Press. p. 287. ISBN 978-0-674-05075-4.
