= Formamide-based prebiotic chemistry =

Scientific hypothesis that life originated from formamide precursors

Formamide-based prebiotic chemistry is a hypothesis about the abiogenesis of life on Earth from non-living chemical precursors which assumes that the chemical compound formamide (NH_{2}CHO), the simplest naturally occurring amide, could have accumulated in sufficiently high amounts to serve as a building block and reaction medium for the synthesis of the first biogenic molecules.

Formamide contains all of the elements required for the synthesis of basic biomolecules (hydrogen, carbon, oxygen, and nitrogen) and is a ubiquitous molecule in the universe. It has been detected in galactic centers, star-forming regions of dense molecular clouds, high-mass young stellar objects, the interstellar medium, comets, and satellites. In particular, dense clouds containing formamide, with sizes on the order of kiloparsecs, have been observed in the vicinity of the Solar System.

Formamide forms under a variety of conditions corresponding to both terrestrial environments and interstellar media: e.g., upon high-energy particle irradiation of binary mixtures of ammonia (NH_{3}) and carbon monoxide (CO), or from the reaction of formic acid (HCOOH) with NH_{3}. It has been suggested that formamide may accumulate in hydrothermal vents in sufficiently high concentrations to enable synthesis of biogenic molecules. Ab initio molecular dynamics simulations suggest that formamide may have been a key intermediate of the Miller–Urey experiment as well.

The combinatorial power of carbon is manifested in the composition of the molecular populations detected in circum- and interstellar media. The number and the complexity of carbon-containing molecules are significantly higher than those of inorganic compounds, presumably all over the universe. One of the most abundant C-containing three-atom molecules observed in space is hydrogen cyanide (HCN). The chemistry of HCN has thus attracted attention in origin of life studies since the earliest times, and the laboratory synthesis of adenine from HCN under presumptive prebiotic conditions was reported as early as 1961. The intrinsic limit of HCN stems from its high reactivity, which leads in turn to instability and the difficulty associated with its concentration and accumulation in unreacted form. The “Warm Little Pond” in which life is supposed to have started, as imagined by Charles Darwin and re-elaborated by Alexander Oparin, had most likely to reach sufficiently high concentrations to start creating the next levels of complexity. Hence the necessity of a derivative of HCN that is sufficiently stable to survive for time periods extended enough to allow its concentration in the actual physico-chemical settings, but that is also sufficiently reactive to originate new compounds in prebiotically plausible environments. Ideally, this derivative should be able to undergo reactions in various directions, without prohibitively high energy barriers, thus allowing the production of different classes of potentially prebiotic compounds. Formamide fulfills all these requirements and, due to its significantly higher boiling point (210 °C), enables chemical synthesis in a much broader temperature range than water.

== Prebiotic chemistry ==
Current lifeforms on Earth are essentially composed of four classes of macromolecular entities: nucleic acids, proteins, carbohydrates, and lipids. Nucleic acids (DNA and RNA) embody and express the genetic information and, together, constitute the genome and the apparatus for its expression (the genotype). Proteins, carbohydrates, and lipids form structures which harness and handle energy from the environment for organizing matter according to the instructions specified by the genotype, aiming to its conservation and transmission. The ensemble of proteins, carbohydrates, lipids, and nucleic acids constitute the phenotype. Life is thus made of the interaction of metabolism and genetics, of the genotype with the phenotype. Both are built around the chemistry of the most common elements in the universe (hydrogen, oxygen, nitrogen, and carbon), with important although ancillary roles being played by phosphorus, sulphur, and a few other elements.

Given the overwhelming variety of the chemically conceivable molecules, the fact that in biological systems we observe only a small subset of all possible organic molecules has raised questions about how and which different reaction pathways could have plausibly led to the synthesis of pre-biological molecules on the primordial Earth. These are the main objectives of prebiotic chemistry research.

== Precursor of biogenic molecules ==
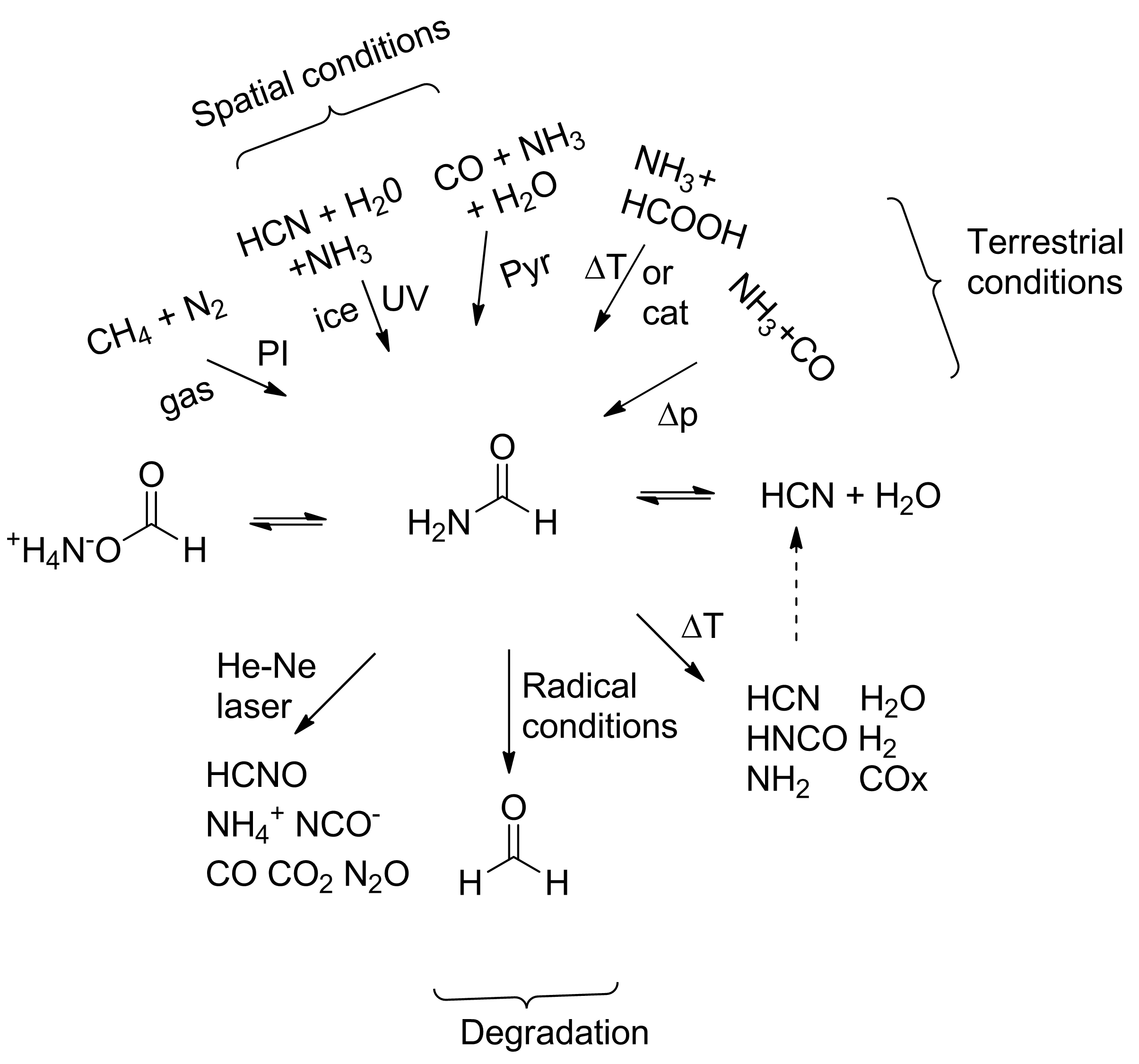
Figure 1. Relationship between formamide and other prebiotic feedstock molecules, such as hydrogen cyanide (HCN) and ammonium formate (NH_{4}^{+}HCOO^{−}).

Figure 1 summarizes the basic chemistry of formamide and its chemical connection with HCN and ammonium formate (NH_{4}^{+}HCOO^{−}), considering selected examples of preparative and degradative reactions.

The synthesis of purine from formamide was first reported in 1980. A series of studies building on this observation was started 20 years later: the synthesis of a large panel of prebiotically relevant compounds (including purine, adenine, cytosine, and 4(3H)pyrimidinone) in good yields was reported in 2001. These products were obtained by heating formamide in the presence of simple catalysts such as calcium carbonate (CaCO_{3}), silica (SiO_{2}), or alumina (Al_{2}O_{3}).

In addition to nucleobases, sugars, carboxylic acids, amino acids, and heterogeneous compounds of various classes (including urea and carbodiimide) were also synthesized. The catalysts studied include, in addition to those mentioned, titanium oxides, clays, cosmic dust analogues, phosphates, iron sulphide minerals, zirconium minerals, borate minerals, and numerous materials of meteoritic origin encompassing iron, stony-iron, chondrites, and achondrites meteorites.

Various energy sources, including thermal energy, UV-radiation, irradiation with high-energy (terawatt) laser pulses, or slow protons were tested. Mimics of different formamide-based prebiotic scenarios have been reconstructed and analyzed, including space-wise solar wind irradiation of meteorites, dynamic chemical gardens, and meteorites in aqueous environments. It has been suggested that the stepwise decrease of the temperature of the prebiotic environment could induce a sequence of strongly non-equilibrium chemical events that led to the emergence of more and more complex species from formamide on the early Earth.

For each studied combination of catalyst/energy source/environment, formamide condensed into a variety of different prebiotically relevant compounds, each combination giving rise to a specific set of relatively complex molecules, usually encompassing several nucleobases, amino acids, and carboxylic acids. The highest level of complexity was attained for the formamide/meteorite system, using proton irradiation as the energy source, where the one-pot synthesis of four nucleosides (uridine, cytidine, adenosine, thymidine) was observed. So far, no other one-carbon atom compound has shown the versatility of products that can be formed from formamide under plausible prebiotic conditions in a one-pot chemical synthesis (see Figure 2).

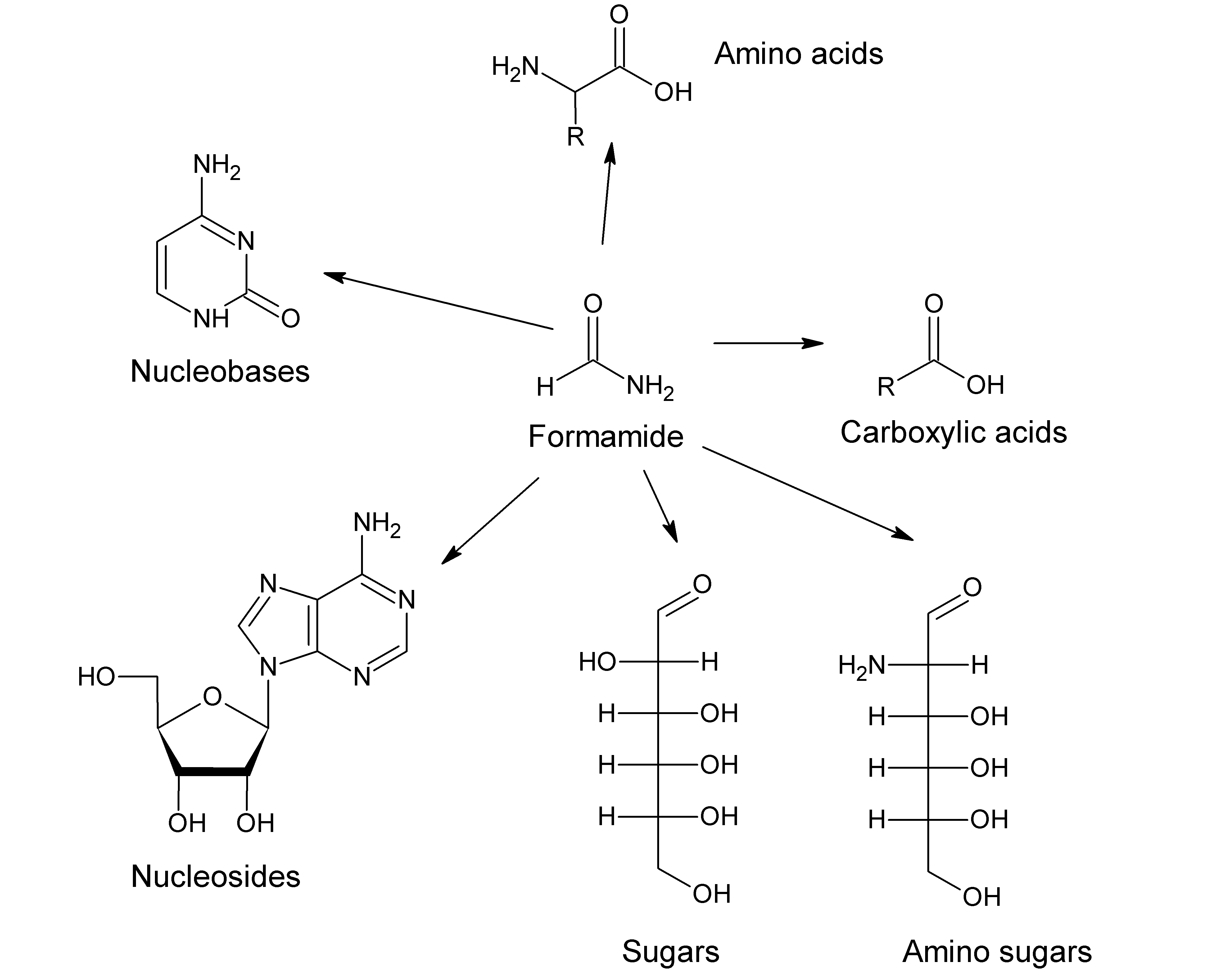
Figure 2. Main prebiotic building blocks that can be synthesized from formamide under plausible prebiotic conditions.^{,}

In addition to its dual function of substrate and solvent in one-pot syntheses affording prebiotic compounds as complex as nucleosides and long aliphatic chains, it has been observed that formamide plays a role in the generation of molecules which are closer to the biological domain. In the presence of a phosphate source (e.g., phosphate minerals), formamide promotes the phosphorylation of nucleosides, leading to the formation of nucleotides, and strongly stimulates the non-enzymatic polymerization of 3’,5’ cyclic nucleotides, leading to the abiotic synthesis of RNA oligomers. This is the reason why formamide is considered a plausible medium for prebiotic phosphorylation reactions also in the “discontinuous synthesis” scenario of the origin of life. As well as phosphorylation, formamide has been shown to be a competent medium for the production of amino acid derivatives from their simple aldehyde and nitrile precursors, demonstrating that water is not the only solvent in which this process can occur. Most notably, formamide provides a medium for the prebiotic synthesis of cysteine derivatives, which was not previously considered plausible in strictly aqueous prebiotic environments.
