= William F. Martin =

American botanist and microbiologist

William Martin (born February 16, 1957, in Bethesda, Maryland) is an American botanist and microbiologist, currently Head of the Institut für Molekulare Evolution, Heinrich Heine Universität, Düsseldorf.

Born in Bethesda, Maryland, Martin was educated at Richland College, Dallas, Texas, and Texas A&M University. After working as a carpenter in Dallas, Martin moved to Hannover, Germany, and obtained his university Diploma from Technische Universität Hannover in 1985. Martin's PhD is from Max-Planck-Institut für Züchtungsforschung, Cologne, where he did postdoctoral research, followed by further postdoctoral work at Institut für Genetik, Technische Universität Braunschweig, where he obtained his Habilitation in 1992. In 1999, Martin became full (C4) professor at Universität Düsseldorf.

Martin is a distinguished and sometimes controversial contributor to the field of molecular evolution and the origin of life. He is known particularly for his work on the evolution of the Calvin cycle and plastids including chloroplasts, and, more generally, for contributions to understanding the origin and evolution of eukaryotic cells. Martin is co-author, with Miklos Mueller of Rockefeller University, of the 1998 paper The Hydrogen hypothesis for the first eukaryote. A wealth of subsequent research papers include contributions, independently and with Michael J. Russell of the NASA Jet Propulsion Laboratory, to understanding the geochemical origins of cells and their biochemical pathways. Martin's work is well cited (nearly 30,000 times) and he has an h-index of 95.

== Awards ==
- 1990: Heinz Maier-Leibnitz-Preis of the Deutsche Forschungsgemeinschaft
- 1997: Technology Transfer Prize, Industrie und Handelskammer Braunschweig
- 1998: Miescher-Ishida Prize of the International Society of Endocytobiology
- 2017: Spiridion Brusina Medal of the Croatian Society of Natural Sciences.
- 2018: Preis der Klüh Stiftung

== Honours ==
- 2000-2007 Foreign Associate, CIAR Programme in Evolutionary Biology
- 2001- Faculty 1000 Member for Plant Genomes and Evolution
- 2006- Elected Fellow, American Academy for Microbiology
- 2006-2009 Julius von Haast Fellow of the New Zealand Ministry for Research, Science and Technology
- 2008 Elected Member of the Nordrhein-Westfälische Akademie der Wissenschaften

== Selected publications ==
- Martin, W; Mueller, M (1998). "The hydrogen hypothesis for the first eukaryote". Nature. 392 (6671): 37–41. Bibcode:1998Natur.392...37M. doi:10.1038/32096. PMID 9510246. S2CID 338885.
- Martin, W; Stoebe, B; Goremykin, V; Hansmann, S; Hasegawa, M; Kowallik, KV (1998). "Gene transfer to the nucleus and the evolution of chloroplasts". Nature. 393 (6681): 162–165. Bibcode:1998Natur.393..162M. doi:10.1038/30234. PMID 11560168. S2CID 205000315.
- Race, HL; Herrmann, RG; Martin, W (1999). "Why have organelles retained genomes?" (PDF). Trends in Genetics. 15 (9): 364–370. doi:10.1016/s0168-9525(99)01766-7. PMID 10461205.
- Martin, W; Rujan, T; Richly, E; Hansen, A; Cornelsen, S; Lins, T; Leister, D; Stoebe, B; Hasegawa, M; Penny, D (2002). "Evolutionary analysis of Arabidopsis, cyanobacterial, and chloroplast genomes reveals plastid phylogeny and thousands of cyanobacterial genes in the nucleus". Proc. Natl. Acad. Sci. USA. 99 (19): 12246–12251. Bibcode:2002PNAS...9912246M. doi:10.1073/pnas.182432999. PMC 129430. PMID 12218172.
- Martin, W; Russell, MJ (2003). "On the origins of cells: An hypothesis for the evolutionary transitions from abiotic geochemistry to chemoautotrophic prokaryotes, and from prokaryotes to nucleated cells". Phil. Trans. R. Soc. Lond. B. 358 (1429): 59–85. doi:10.1098/rstb.2002.1183. PMC 1693102. PMID 12594918.
- Weiss, MC; Sousa, FL; Mrnjavac, N; Neukirchen, S; Roettger, M; Nelson-Sathi, S; Martin, WF (2016). "The physiology and habitat of the last universal common ancestor". Nature Microbiology. 1 (9): 16116. doi:10.1038/nmicrobiol.2016.116. PMID 27562259. S2CID 2997255.
