= Stuart Kingsley =

Stuart Kingsley (born May 15, 1948) is considered a pioneer in the Optical Search For Extraterrestrial Intelligence, also known as Optical SETI (OSETI).

While traditional SETI efforts survey the sky in hopes of finding radio transmissions from a nearby civilization, the optical approach to SETI seeks to detect pulsed and continuous wave laser beacons signals in the visible and infrared spectrums. In other words, instead of "listening" for extraterrestrial intelligence, Optical SETI "looks" for it.

Kingsley received a B.Sc. Honors and Ph.D. in electronic and electrical engineering from The City University (London, England), and University College London, England in 1972 and 1984, respectively. He moved to the United States in 1981 and went to work for Battelle Columbus Division as a principal research scientist, becoming a senior research scientist in 1985. He left Battelle in 1987 and established his own photonics consultancy business, Fiberdyne Optoelectronics.

Kingsley is the Director of The Columbus Optical SETI Observatory, which is currently working to achieve nonprofit status. Since 1992 he has been the VP for Engineering at SRICO, Inc. Kingsley retired from Srico, Inc. and returned to England in 2008, meaning that the Columbus Optical SETI Observatory has effectively moved to Bournemouth.
