= Michael Yarus =

American biologist

Michael Yarus is an American molecular biologist and Professor Emeritus in the Department of Molecular, Cellular and Developmental Biology at the University of Colorado Boulder. His research has focused on the molecular mechanisms of translation, tRNA structure and function, RNA catalysis, RNA–amino acid interactions, and the origin and evolution of the genetic code.

Yarus's research has addressed both the mechanisms by which ribosomes accurately translate messenger RNA and broader questions concerning the role of RNA in early biological evolution. His work includes studies of tRNA decoding, codon context and translation rates, aminoacyl-tRNA editing, RNA binding sites, ribozymes, and proposed stereochemical relationships between RNA sequences and amino acids in the genetic code. He was elected a Fellow of the American Association for the Advancement of Science in 2008 for his work on ribosomes and RNA and their role in the evolution of life.

== Early life and education ==
Yarus was born in Pikeville, Kentucky. He received a bachelor's degree in biophysics from Johns Hopkins University in 1960 and a Ph.D. in biophysics from the California Institute of Technology in 1965.His doctoral research concerned the bacteriophage ΦX174 and included experiments on the sensitivity of the virus and its DNA to ultraviolet radiation. His dissertation examined the sensitivity of bacteriophage ΦX174 to ultraviolet light and its growth in starved and irradiated cells.

Following his doctorate, Yarus conducted postdoctoral research at Stanford University with Paul Berg, studying tRNA and molecular mechanisms involved in protein synthesis. His early work with Berg included research on recognition of tRNA by aminoacyl-tRNA synthetases.

== Academic career ==
Yarus joined the faculty of the University of Colorado Boulder in 1967. He initially held appointments in the Department of Chemistry and subsequently in the Department of Molecular, Cellular and Developmental Biology.

He became an associate professor in 1973 and a professor in 1979. From 1992 to 1995, he served as chair of the Department of Molecular, Cellular and Developmental Biology. He became Professor Emeritus in 2008.

During his academic career, Yarus also held visiting and advisory positions. He was a visiting researcher at the MRC Laboratory of Molecular Biology in Cambridge in 1968 and a visiting professor at the University of Copenhagen in 1978.

In 1981, Yarus co-founded Synergen with three colleagues, a biotechnology company in Boulder, Colorado, and served as its director of research. He subsequently served on scientific advisory boards, including those of Nexagen and CODA Genomics..

Yarus has also held editorial and professional appointments, including service connected with RNA Biology and membership in the Faculty of 1000. His research has received support from the National Institutes of Health and other research programs.

== Research ==
=== Early biochemical research ===
One of Yarus's earliest research areas concerned the effects of ultraviolet radiation on biological molecules. During his doctoral work, he studied the bacteriophage ΦX174 and investigated the wavelength-dependent effects of ultraviolet radiation on the virus, its single-stranded DNA, and its double-stranded replicative form. The experiments found that ultraviolet inactivation of ΦX174 was attributable primarily to damage to its DNA, while the response of the double-stranded replicative form depended in part on the ability of the host cells to repair ultraviolet damage.

=== Translation and tRNA ===
A major part of Yarus's research has concerned the molecular mechanisms by which ribosomes translate messenger RNA into proteins. His laboratory has investigated the fundamental reactions of the translational apparatus and the roles of particular tRNA and mRNA sequences in translational efficiency and accuracy.

In early work on tRNA, Yarus investigated the recognition of tRNA by aminoacyl-tRNA synthetases and the mechanisms by which these enzymes distinguish appropriate from inappropriate substrates.

In 1982, Yarus published "Translational Efficiency of Transfer RNA's: Uses of an Extended Anticodon" in Science. The work examined how regions beyond the conventional three-base anticodon contribute to the efficiency and specificity of tRNA decoding.

==== Waggle theory and reading-frame maintenance ====
Yarus developed a model of tRNA movement and conformational flexibility during decoding that became known as the Waggle theory. In work with Drew Smith, he proposed that the structure of the tRNA anticodon region and adjacent portions of the molecule could undergo conformational changes during interactions with the ribosome, helping explain how tRNAs recognize codons while maintaining the translational reading frame.

The model was related to experimental studies of tRNA mutations and frameshift suppression. In a 1987 Science paper with James F. Curran, Yarus examined reading-frame selection and proposed a molecular model for maintaining the correct three-nucleotide reading frame during translation.

Later work using structural and kinetic evidence provided support for the idea that a conformationally flexible or "waggling" tRNA intermediate participates in decoding and influences the ribosome's decision to accept or reject a codon–anticodon interaction.

=== Translation accuracy and editing ===
Yarus's research also addressed the mechanisms that prevent errors during protein synthesis. In the early 1970s, he studied the ability of aminoacyl-tRNA synthetases to recognize and remove incorrectly attached amino acids. In 1972, Yarus reported that phenylalanyl-tRNA synthetase could hydrolyze an incorrectly aminoacylated tRNA, providing evidence for an editing or verification mechanism that could correct an aminoacyl-tRNA after an incorrect amino acid had been attached.

The work became part of Yarus's broader studies of translational accuracy and aminoacyl-tRNA editing. The University of Colorado identifies his discovery of hydrolytic editing by aminoacyl-tRNA synthetases as an important early contribution to this area, noting that the discovery occurred contemporaneously with work by the laboratory of Paul Schimmel.

Yarus later studied proofreading during codon recognition. His work with Mikel Valle and Joachim Frank proposed that conformational changes in aminoacyl-tRNA contribute to the ribosome's proofreading of codon–anticodon interactions.

=== Codon context and translation rates ===
Yarus investigated how the nucleotide sequences surrounding a codon can influence translation. In a 1985 paper with Linda S. Folley, he examined patterns of codon context in bacterial messenger RNAs.

A subsequent study in Science demonstrated that the translational activity of a tRNA at a particular codon could vary according to the surrounding messenger-RNA sequence, even when the codon itself remained unchanged. Yarus and James F. Curran also developed quantitative methods for comparing the rates at which individual codons are translated in vivo. Their "translation speedometer" approach used frameshifting associated with slow decoding of an in-frame codon to measure relative translation rates.

=== RNA catalysis and the RNA world ===
Beginning in the 1980s and continuing through subsequent decades, Yarus's research increasingly examined the catalytic and binding capabilities of RNA. In 1988, Yarus reported the identification of a specific amino-acid binding site composed of RNA in a study published in Science.

Subsequent research examined RNA binding sites for amino acids including arginine, isoleucine, phenylalanine, tryptophan and histidine, as well as RNA molecules capable of catalyzing biochemical reactions.

In 1995, Yarus and colleagues reported the synthesis of aminoacyl-RNA catalyzed by an RNA molecule, demonstrating that RNA could catalyze a reaction relevant to protein synthesis without the direct participation of a protein enzyme.

In 2010, Yarus published Life from an RNA World: The Ancestor Within, a book examining the RNA-world hypothesis and the possible characteristics of early RNA-based life. The book was reviewed in Nature, which described it as an examination of theoretical and experimental evidence relevant to the RNA-world hypothesis.

=== Origin and evolution of the genetic code ===
A major component of Yarus's later research concerns the origin of the genetic code and the possibility that some of its assignments arose from direct chemical interactions between amino acids and RNA. Yarus has investigated RNA binding sites in which sequences corresponding to amino-acid codons or anticodons occur more frequently than expected. His work has argued that such relationships may preserve evidence of an earlier stereochemical connection between amino acids and RNA sequences. In 2000, Yarus reported that selected and natural RNA binding sites for several amino acids contained an excess of sequences corresponding to codons for those amino acids, proposing that such chemical relationships could represent a testable source for portions of the genetic code. In 2005, Yarus, J. Gregory Caporaso, and Rob Knight developed what they called the escaped triplet theory. They proposed that some nucleotide triplets originally present in RNA amino-acid binding sites could have subsequently become codons and anticodons in the genetic code.

Yarus continued to develop the stereochemical hypothesis in subsequent studies. A 2017 review examined RNA–amino acid affinities and their possible relationship to the evolution of the genetic code, while later work considered possible evolutionary pathways from early RNA coding systems to the modern standard genetic code.

=== Membrane associated protogenome ===
Another area of Yarus's research has concerned the interaction of RNA with phospholipid membranes. His laboratory investigated RNA molecules capable of associating with lipid bilayers and considered possible biological functions for membrane-associated RNAs.

Studies from his group included RNA affinity for phospholipid bilayers, membrane-associated tRNA, and an RNA-based membrane transporter for tryptophan.

== Industry and scientific service ==
In 1981, Yarus co-founded Synergen in Boulder, Colorado, where he served as Director of Research. The company subsequently became associated with the development of biotechnology products and was later acquired by Amgen.

Yarus has served on scientific advisory boards and as an adviser to research institutions. His academic service has included participation in peer review and scientific evaluation, including membership in the NIH College of CSR Reviewers. He has also served on editorial boards and as a reviewer for scientific journals in molecular biology, genetics, and biochemistry.

== Awards and honors ==
Yarus was elected a Fellow of the American Association for the Advancement of Science in 2008. The AAAS recognized his work concerning ribosomes and RNA and their role in the evolution of life.

His other honors include a Phi Beta Kappa election and undergraduate honors at Johns Hopkins University, a Woodrow Wilson Fellowship, an NIH postdoctoral fellowship, an NIH MERIT Award, and recognition as a Distinguished Research Lecturer at the University of Colorado Boulder.

In 1994, he served as chair of the Nucleic Acids Gordon Research Conference with Peter Moore.

== Selected publications ==
- Yarus, Michael. "Ultraviolet Sensitivity of the Biological Activity of ΦX174 Virus, Single-Stranded DNA, and RF DNA." Biophysical Journal (1967).
- Yarus, Michael. "Phenylalanyl-tRNA Synthetase and Isoleucyl-tRNA^{Phe}: A Possible Verification Mechanism for Aminoacyl-tRNA." Proceedings of the National Academy of Sciences (1972).
- Yarus, Michael. "Translational Efficiency of Transfer RNA's: Uses of an Extended Anticodon." Science (1982).
- Curran, James F., and Michael Yarus. "Reading Frame Selection and Transfer RNA Anticodon Loop Stacking." Science (1987).
- Yarus, Michael. "A Specific Amino Acid Binding Site Composed of RNA." Science (1988).
- Curran, James F., and Michael Yarus. "Rates of Aminoacyl-tRNA Selection at 29 Sense Codons In Vivo." Journal of Molecular Biology (1989).
- Yarus, Michael, and Drew Smith. "tRNA on the Ribosome: A Waggle Theory." In tRNA: Structure, Biosynthesis, and Function (1995).
- Illangasekare, Mangala, et al. "Aminoacyl-RNA Synthesis Catalyzed by an RNA." Science (1995).
- Yarus, Michael. "RNA–Ligand Chemistry: A Testable Source for the Genetic Code." RNA (2000).
- Yarus, Michael, J. Gregory Caporaso, and Rob Knight. "Origins of the Genetic Code: The Escaped Triplet Theory." Annual Review of Biochemistry (2005).
- Yarus, Michael, Jeremy Joseph Widmann, and Rob Knight. "RNA–Amino Acid Binding: A Stereochemical Era for the Genetic Code." Journal of Molecular Evolution (2009).
- Yarus, Michael. Life from an RNA World: The Ancestor Within (2010).
- Turk, R. M., N. V. Chumachenko, and Michael Yarus. "Multiple Translational Products from a Five-Nucleotide Ribozyme." Proceedings of the National Academy of Sciences (2010).
