= Alternative abiogenesis scenarios =

Proposed alternative scenarios related to abiogenesis

A scenario is a set of related concepts pertinent to the origin of life (abiogenesis), such as the iron-sulfur world. Many alternative abiogenesis scenarios have been proposed by scientists in a variety of fields from the 1950s onwards in an attempt to explain how the complex mechanisms of life could have come into existence. These include hypothesized ancient environments that might have been favourable for the origin of life, and possible biochemical mechanisms.

== Environments ==
Many environments have been proposed for the origin of life.

=== Fluctuating salinity: dilute and dry-down ===
Harold Blum noted in 1957 that if proto-nucleic acid chains spontaneously form duplex structures, then there is no way to dissociate them.

The Oparin-Haldane hypothesis addresses the formation, but not the dissociation, of nucleic acid polymers and duplexes. However, nucleic acids are unusual because, in the absence of counterions (low salt) to neutralize the high charges on opposing phosphate groups, the nucleic acid duplex dissociates into single chains. Early tides, driven by a close moon, could have generated rapid cycles of dilution (high tide, low salt) and concentration (dry-down at low tide, high salt) that exclusively promoted the replication of nucleic acids through a process dubbed tidal chain reaction (TCR). This theory has been criticized on the grounds that early tides may not have been so rapid, although regression from current values requires an Earth–Moon juxtaposition at around two Ga, for which there is no evidence, and early tides may have been approximately every seven hours. Another critique is that only 2–3% of the Earth's crust may have been exposed above the sea until late in terrestrial evolution.

The tidal chain reaction theory has mechanistic advantages over thermal association/dissociation at deep-sea vents because it requires that chain assembly (template-driven polymerization) takes place during the dry-down phase, when precursors are most concentrated, whereas thermal cycling needs polymerization to take place during the cold phase, when the rate of chain assembly is lowest and precursors are likely to be more dilute.

=== Hot freshwater lakes ===
Jack W. Szostak suggested that geothermal activity provides greater opportunities for the origination of life in open lakes where there is a buildup of minerals. In 2010, based on spectral analysis of sea and hot mineral water, Ignat Ignatov and Oleg Mosin demonstrated that life may have predominantly originated in hot mineral water. Hot mineral water that contains hydrogen carbonate and calcium ions has the most optimal range. This case is similar to the origin of life in hydrothermal vents, but with hydrogen carbonate and calcium ions in hot water. The main studies were conducted in Rupite, Bulgaria, where a novel thermophylic bacterium Anoxybacillus rupiences sp. Nov. and cyanobacteria were identified. At a pH of 9–11, the reactions can take place in seawater. According to Melvin Calvin, certain reactions of condensation-dehydration of amino acids and nucleotides in individual blocks of peptides and nucleic acids can take place in the primary hydrosphere with pH 9–11 at a later evolutionary stage. Some of these compounds like hydrocyanic acid (HCN) have been proven in the experiments of Miller. This is the environment in which the stromatolites have been created. David Ward described the formation of stromatolites in hot mineral water at the Yellowstone National Park. In 2011, Tadashi Sugawara created a protocell in hot water.

=== Geothermal springs ===
Bruce Damer and David Deamer argue that cell membranes cannot be formed in salty seawater, and must therefore have originated in freshwater environments like pools replenished by a combination of geothermal springs and rainfall. Before the continents formed, the only dry land on Earth would be volcanic islands, where rainwater would form ponds where lipids could form the first stages towards cell membranes. During multiple wet-dry cycles, biopolymers would be synthesized and are encapsulated in vesicles after condensation. Zinc sulfide and manganese sulfide in these ponds would have catalyzed organic compounds by abiotic photosynthesis. Experimental research at geothermal springs successfully synthesized polymers and were encapsulated in vesicles after exposure to UV light and multiple wet-dry cycles. At temperatures of 60 to 80 °C at geothermal fields, biochemical reactions can occur. These predecessors of true cells are assumed to have behaved more like a superorganism rather than individual structures, where the porous membranes would house molecules which would leak out and enter other protocells. Only when true cells had evolved would they gradually adapt to saltier environments and enter the ocean.

6 of the 11 biochemical reactions of the rTCA cycle can occur in hot metal-rich acidic water which suggests metabolic reactions might have originated in this environment, this is consistent with the enhanced stability of RNA phosphodiester, aminoacyl-tRNA bonds, and peptides in acidic conditions. Cycling between supercritical and subcritical CO_{2} at tectonic fault zones might have led to peptides integrating with and stabilizing lipid membranes. This is suggested to have driven membrane protein evolution, as it shown that a selected peptide (H-Lys-Ser-Pro-Phe-Pro-Phe-Ala-Ala-OH) causes the increase of membrane permeability to water. David Deamer and Bruce Damer states that the prebiotic chemistry does not require ultraviolet irradiation as the chemistry could also have occurred under shaded areas that protected biomolecules from photolysis.

=== Deep sea alkaline vents ===
Nick Lane believes that no known life forms could have utilized zinc-sulfide based photosynthesis, lightning, volcanic pyrite synthesis, or UV radiation as a source of energy. Rather, he instead suggests that deep sea alkaline vents is more likely to have been a source energy for early cellular life. Serpentinization at alkaline hydrothermal vents produce methane and ammonia. Mineral particles that have similar properties to enzymes at deep sea vents would catalyze organic compounds out of dissolved CO_{2} within seawater. Porous rock might have promoted condensation reactions of biopolymers and act as a compartment of membranous structures, however it is unknown about how it could promote coding and metabolism. Acetyl phosphate, which is readily synthesized from thioacetate, can promote aggregation of adenosine monophosphate of up to 7 monomers which is considered energetically favored in water due to interactions between nucleobases. Acetyl phosphate can stabilize aggregation of nucleotides in the presence of Na^{+} and could possibly promote polymerization at mineral surfaces or lower water activity. An external proton gradient within a membrane would have been maintained between the acidic ocean and alkaline seawater. The descendants of the last universal common ancestor, bacteria and archaea, were probably methanogens and acetogens. The earliest microfossils, dated to be 4.28 to 3.77 Ga, were found at hydrothermal vent precipitates. These microfossils suggest that early cellular life began at deep sea hydrothermal vents. Exergonic reactions at these environments could have provided free energy that promoted chemical reactions conducive to prebiotic biomolecules.

Nonenzymatic reactions of glycolysis and the pentose phosphate pathway can occur in the presence of ferrous iron at 70 °C, the reactions produce erythrose 4-phosphate, an amino acid precursor and ribose 5-phosphate, a nucleotide precursor. Pyrimidines are shown to be synthesized from the reaction between aspartate and carbamoyl phosphate at 60 °C and in the presence of metals, it is suggested that purines could be synthesized from the catalysis of metals. Adenosine monophosphate are also shown to be synthesized from adenine, monopotassium phosphate or pyrophosphate, and ribose at silica at 70 °C. Reductive amination and transamination reactions catalyzed by alkaline hydrothermal vent mineral and metal ions produce amino acids. Long chain fatty acids can be derived from formic acid or oxalic acid during Fischer-Tropsch-type synthesis. Carbohydrates containing an isoprene skeleton can be synthesized from the formose reaction. Isoprenoids incorporated into fatty acid vesicles can stabilize the vesicles, which are suggested to have driven the divergence of bacterial and archaeal lipids.

==== A scenario ====
Lane has proposed a possible scenario for the origin of life that integrates much of the available evidence from biochemistry, geology, phylogeny, and experimentation:

Iron-sulfur minerals like greigite catalyse the reduction of carbon dioxide in hydrothermal vents to make Krebs cycle intermediates.

Protocells in contact with a thin rock barrier in a hydrothermal vent get a free supply of energy from the pH gradient.

Protocells in a hydrothermal vent can grow by adding fatty acids to their membrane, other organics to their cytoplasm.

Nucleotides in a protocell in a hydrothermal vent can polymerise into random strings of RNA. Any that have even slight catalytic activity will favour the growth and replication of their protocells, a start to natural selection.

A protocell away from a hydrothermal vent must create its own proton-motive force, such as by splitting hydrogen sulfide.

Ferredoxin catalyses the splitting of hydrogen sulfide, its earliest repeating amino acid sequence perhaps coded for by an incomplete genetic code.

Anoxygenic photosynthesis, using hydrogen sulfide, ended the need for scarce hydrogen.

Early heterotrophs used Krebs cycle respiration; then oxygenic photosynthesis gave full independence of volcanic energy.

=== Volcanic ash in the ocean ===
Geoffrey W. Hoffmann has argued that a complex nucleation event as the origin of life involving both polypeptides and nucleic acid is compatible with the time and space available in the primary oceans of Earth. Hoffmann suggests that volcanic ash may provide the many random shapes needed in the postulated complex nucleation event. This aspect of the theory can be tested experimentally.

=== Gold's deep-hot biosphere ===
In the 1970s, Thomas Gold proposed the theory that life first developed not on the surface of the Earth, but several kilometers below the surface. It is claimed that the discovery of microbial life below the surface of another body in our Solar System would lend significant credence to this theory.

=== Radioactive beach hypothesis ===
Zachary Adam claims that tidal processes that occurred during a time when the Moon was much closer may have concentrated grains of uranium and other radioactive elements at the high-water mark on primordial beaches, where they may have been responsible for generating life's building blocks. According to computer models, a deposit of such radioactive materials could show the same self-sustaining nuclear reaction as that found in the Oklo uranium ore seam in Gabon. Such radioactive beach sand might have provided sufficient energy to generate organic molecules, such as amino acids and sugars from acetonitrile in water. Radioactive monazite material also has released soluble phosphate into the regions between sand-grains, making it biologically "accessible." Thus amino acids, sugars, and soluble phosphates might have been produced simultaneously, according to Adam. Radioactive actinides, left behind in some concentration by the reaction, might have formed part of organometallic complexes. These complexes could have been important early catalysts to living processes.

John Parnell has suggested that such a process could provide part of the "crucible of life" in the early stages of any early wet rocky planet, so long as the planet is large enough to have generated a system of plate tectonics which brings radioactive minerals to the surface. As the early Earth is thought to have had many smaller plates, it might have provided a suitable environment for such processes.

=== The hypercycle ===
In the early 1970s, Manfred Eigen and Peter Schuster examined the transient stages between the molecular chaos and a self-replicating hypercycle in a prebiotic soup. In a hypercycle, the information storing system (possibly RNA) produces an enzyme, which catalyzes the formation of another information system, in sequence until the product of the last aids in the formation of the first information system. Mathematically treated, hypercycles could create quasispecies, which through natural selection entered into a form of Darwinian evolution. A boost to hypercycle theory was the discovery of ribozymes capable of catalyzing their own chemical reactions. The hypercycle theory requires the existence of complex biochemicals, such as nucleotides, which do not form under the conditions proposed by the Miller–Urey experiment.

=== Iron–sulfur world ===
In the 1980s, Wächtershäuser and Karl Popper postulated the iron–sulfur world hypothesis for the evolution of pre-biotic chemical pathways. It traces today's biochemistry to primordial reactions which synthesize organic building blocks from gases. Wächtershäuser systems have a built-in source of energy: iron sulfides such as pyrite. The energy released by oxidising these metal sulfides can support synthesis of organic molecules. Such systems may have evolved into autocatalytic sets constituting self-replicating, metabolically active entities predating modern life forms. Experiments with sulfides in an aqueous environment at 100 °C produced a small yield of dipeptides (0.4% to 12.4%) and a smaller yield of tripeptides (0.10%). However, under the same conditions, dipeptides were quickly broken down.

Several models postulate a primitive metabolism, allowing RNA replication to emerge later. The centrality of the Krebs cycle (citric acid cycle) to energy production in aerobic organisms, and in drawing in carbon dioxide and hydrogen ions in biosynthesis of complex organic chemicals, suggests that it was one of the first parts of the metabolism to evolve. Concordantly, geochemists Szostak and Kate Adamala demonstrated that non-enzymatic RNA replication in primitive protocells is only possible in the presence of weak cation chelators like citric acid. This provides further evidence for the central role of citric acid in primordial metabolism. Russell has proposed that "the purpose of life is to hydrogenate carbon dioxide" (as part of a "metabolism-first", rather than a "genetics-first", scenario). The physicist Jeremy England has argued from general thermodynamic considerations that life was inevitable. An early version of this idea was Oparin's 1924 proposal for self-replicating vesicles. In the 1980s and 1990s came Wächtershäuser's iron–sulfur world theory and Christian de Duve's thioester models. More abstract and theoretical arguments for metabolism without genes include Freeman Dyson's mathematical model and Stuart Kauffman's collectively autocatalytic sets in the 1980s. Kauffman's work has been criticized for ignoring the role of energy in driving biochemical reactions in cells.

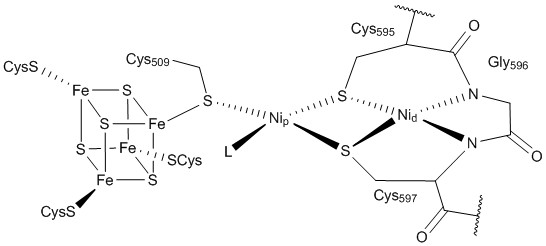
The active site of the acetyl-CoA synthase enzyme, part of the acetyl-CoA pathway, contains nickel-iron-sulfur clusters.

A multistep biochemical pathway like the Krebs cycle did not just self-organize on the surface of a mineral; it must have been preceded by simpler pathways. The Wood–Ljungdahl pathway is compatible with self-organization on a metal sulfide surface. Its key enzyme unit, carbon monoxide dehydrogenase/acetyl-CoA synthase, contains mixed nickel-iron-sulfur clusters in its reaction centers and catalyzes the formation of acetyl-CoA. However, prebiotic thiolated and thioester compounds are thermodynamically and kinetically unlikely to accumulate in the presumed prebiotic conditions of hydrothermal vents. One possibility is that cysteine and homocysteine may have reacted with nitriles from the Strecker reaction, forming catalytic thiol-rich polypeptides.

It has been suggested that the iron-sulfur world hypothesis and RNA world hypothesis are not mutually exclusive as modern cellular processes do involve both metabolites and genetic molecules.

=== Zinc world ===
Armen Mulkidjanian's zinc world (Zn-world) hypothesis extends Wächtershäuser's pyrite hypothesis. The Zn-world theory proposes that hydrothermal fluids rich in H_{2}S interacting with cold primordial ocean (or Darwin's "warm little pond") water precipitated metal sulfide particles. Oceanic hydrothermal systems have a zonal structure reflected in ancient volcanogenic massive sulfide ore deposits. They reach many kilometers in diameter and date back to the Archean. Most abundant are pyrite (FeS_{2}), chalcopyrite (CuFeS_{2}), and sphalerite (ZnS), with additions of galena (PbS) and alabandite (MnS). ZnS and MnS have a unique ability to store radiation energy, e.g. from ultraviolet light. When replicating molecules were originating, the primordial atmospheric pressure was high enough (>100 bar) to precipitate near the Earth's surface, and ultraviolet irradiation was 10 to 100 times more intense than now; hence the photosynthetic properties mediated by ZnS provided the right energy conditions for the synthesis of informational and metabolic molecules and the selection of photostable nucleobases.

The Zn-world theory has been filled out with evidence for the ionic constitution of the interior of the first protocells. In 1926, the Canadian biochemist Archibald Macallum noted the resemblance of body fluids such as blood and lymph to seawater; however, the inorganic composition of all cells differ from that of modern seawater, which led Mulkidjanian and colleagues to reconstruct the "hatcheries" of the first cells combining geochemical analysis with phylogenomic scrutiny of the inorganic ion requirements of modern cells. The authors conclude that ubiquitous, and by inference primordial, proteins and functional systems show affinity to and functional requirement for K^{+}, Zn^{2+}, Mn^{2+}, and [PO_{4}]^{3−}. Geochemical reconstruction shows that this ionic composition could not have existed in the ocean but is compatible with inland geothermal systems. In the oxygen-depleted, CO_{2}-dominated primordial atmosphere, the chemistry of water condensates near geothermal fields would resemble the internal milieu of modern cells. Therefore, precellular evolution may have taken place in shallow "Darwin ponds" lined with porous silicate minerals mixed with metal sulfides and enriched in K^{+}, Zn^{2+}, and phosphorus compounds.

==== Clay ====
The clay hypothesis was proposed by Graham Cairns-Smith in 1985. It postulates that complex organic molecules arose gradually on pre-existing, non-organic replication surfaces of silicate crystals in contact with an aqueous solution. The clay mineral montmorillonite has been shown to catalyze the polymerization of RNA in aqueous solution from nucleotide monomers, and the formation of membranes from lipids. In 1998, Hyman Hartman proposed that "the first organisms were self-replicating iron-rich clays which fixed carbon dioxide into oxalic acid and other dicarboxylic acids. This system of replicating clays and their metabolic phenotype then evolved into the sulfide rich region of the hot spring acquiring the ability to fix nitrogen. Finally phosphate was incorporated into the evolving system which allowed the synthesis of nucleotides and phospholipids."

== Biochemistry ==
Different forms of life with variable origin processes may have appeared quasi-simultaneously in the early Earth. The other forms may be extinct, having left distinctive fossils through their different biochemistry. Metabolism-like reactions could have occurred naturally in early oceans, before the first organisms evolved. Some of these reactions can produce RNA, and others resemble two essential reaction cascades of metabolism: glycolysis and the pentose phosphate pathway, that provide essential precursors for nucleic acids, amino acids and lipids.

=== Fox proteinoids ===
In trying to uncover the intermediate stages of abiogenesis mentioned by Bernal, Sidney Fox in the 1950s and 1960s studied the spontaneous formation of peptide structures under plausibly early Earth conditions. In one of his experiments, he allowed amino acids to dry out as if puddled in a warm, dry spot in prebiotic conditions: In an experiment to set suitable conditions for life to form, Fox collected volcanic material from a cinder cone in Hawaii. He discovered that the temperature was over 100 °C just 4 inches (100 mm) beneath the surface of the cinder cone, and suggested that this might have been the environment in which life was created—molecules could have formed and then been washed through the loose volcanic ash into the sea. He placed lumps of lava over amino acids derived from methane, ammonia and water, sterilized all materials, and baked the lava over the amino acids for a few hours in a glass oven. A brown, sticky substance formed over the surface, and when the lava was drenched in sterilized water, a thick, brown liquid leached out. He found that, as they dried, the amino acids formed long, often cross-linked, thread-like, submicroscopic polypeptides.

=== Protein amyloid ===
An origin-of-life theory based on self-replicating beta-sheet structures has been put forward by Maury in 2009. The theory suggest that self-replicating and self-assembling catalytic amyloids were the first informational polymers in a primitive pre-RNA world. The main arguments for the amyloid hypothesis is based on the structural stability, autocatalytic and catalytic properties, and evolvability of beta-sheet based informational systems. Such systems are also error correcting and chiroselective.

=== First protein that condenses substrates during thermal cycling: thermosynthesis ===
Convection cells in fluid placed in a gravity field are selforganizing and enable thermal cycling of the suspended contents in the fluid such as protocells containing protoenzymes that work on thermal cycling.

The thermosynthesis hypothesis considers chemiosmosis more basal than fermentation: the ATP synthase enzyme, which sustains chemiosmosis, is the currently extant enzyme most closely related to the first metabolic process. The thermosynthesis hypothesis does not even invoke a pathway: ATP synthase's binding change mechanism resembles a physical adsorption process that yields free energy. The result would be convection which would bring a continual supply of reactants to the protoenzyme. The described first protein may be simple in the sense that it requires only a short sequence of conserved amino acid residues, a sequent sufficient for the appropriate catalytic cleft.

=== Pre-RNA world: The ribose issue and its bypass ===
A different type of nucleic acid, such as peptide nucleic acid, threose nucleic acid or glycol nucleic acid, could have been the first to emerge as a self-reproducing molecule, later replaced by RNA. Larralde et al., say that "the generally accepted prebiotic synthesis of ribose, the formose reaction, yields numerous sugars without any selectivity". They conclude that "the backbone of the first genetic material could not have contained ribose or other sugars because of their instability", meaning that the ester linkage of ribose and phosphoric acid in RNA is prone to hydrolysis.

Pyrimidine ribonucleosides and nucleotides have been synthesized by reactions which by-pass the free sugars, and are assembled stepwise using nitrogenous or oxygenous chemistries. Sutherland has demonstrated high-yielding routes to cytidine and uridine ribonucleotides from small 2 and 3 carbon fragments such as glycolaldehyde, glyceraldehyde or glyceraldehyde-3-phosphate, cyanamide and cyanoacetylene. A step in this sequence allows the isolation of enantiopure ribose aminooxazoline if the enantiomeric excess of glyceraldehyde is 60% or greater. This can be viewed as a prebiotic purification step. Ribose aminooxazoline can then react with cyanoacetylene to give alpha cytidine ribonucleotide. Photoanomerization with UV light allows for inversion about the 1' anomeric centre to give the correct beta stereochemistry. In 2009 they showed that the same simple building blocks allow access, via phosphate controlled nucleobase elaboration, to 2',3'-cyclic pyrimidine nucleotides directly, which can polymerize into RNA. Similar photo-sanitization can create pyrimidine-2',3'-cyclic phosphates.

=== Autocatalysis ===
Autocatalysts are substances that catalyze the production of themselves and therefore are "molecular replicators." The simplest self-replicating chemical systems are autocatalytic, and typically contain three components: a product molecule and two precursor molecules. The product molecule joins the precursor molecules, which in turn produce more product molecules from more precursor molecules. The product molecule catalyzes the reaction by providing a complementary template that binds to the precursors, thus bringing them together. Such systems have been demonstrated both in biological macromolecules and in small organic molecules.

It has been proposed that life initially arose as autocatalytic chemical networks. Julius Rebek and colleagues combined amino adenosine and pentafluorophenyl esters with the autocatalyst amino adenosine triacid ester (AATE). One product was a variant of AATE which catalyzed its own synthesis. This demonstrated that autocatalysts could compete within a population of entities with heredity, a rudimentary form of natural selection.

=== Synthesis based on hydrogen cyanide ===
A research project completed in 2015 by John Sutherland and others found that a network of reactions beginning with hydrogen cyanide and hydrogen sulfide, in streams of water irradiated by UV light, could produce the chemical components of proteins and lipids, as well as those of RNA, while not producing a wide range of other compounds. The researchers used the term "cyanosulfidic" to describe this network of reactions.

=== Simulated chemical pathways ===
In 2020, chemists described possible chemical pathways from nonliving prebiotic chemicals to complex biochemicals that could give rise to living organisms, based on a new computer program named AllChemy.

== Viral origin ==
Evidence for a "virus first" or "virus world" hypothesis, which may support theories of the RNA world, was suggested in 2015. One of the difficulties for the study of the origins of viruses is their high rate of mutation; this is particularly the case in RNA retroviruses like HIV. A 2015 study compared protein fold structures across different branches of the tree of life, where researchers can reconstruct the evolutionary histories of the folds and of the organisms whose genomes code for those folds. They argue that protein folds are better markers of ancient events as their three-dimensional structures can be maintained even as the sequences that code for those begin to change. Thus, the viral protein repertoire retain traces of ancient evolutionary history that can be recovered using advanced bioinformatics approaches. Those researchers think that "the prolonged pressure of genome and particle size reduction eventually reduced virocells into modern viruses (identified by the complete loss of cellular makeup), meanwhile other coexisting cellular lineages diversified into modern cells." The data suggest that viruses originated from ancient cells that co-existed with the ancestors of modern cells. These ancient cells likely contained segmented RNA genomes.

A computational model (2015) has shown that virus capsids may have originated in the RNA world and served as a means of horizontal transfer between replicator communities. These communities could not survive if the number of gene parasites increased, with certain genes being responsible for the formation of these structures and those that favored the survival of self-replicating communities. The displacement of these ancestral genes between cellular organisms could favor the appearance of new viruses during evolution. Viruses retain a replication module inherited from the prebiotic stage since it is absent in cells. So this is evidence that viruses could originate from the RNA world and could also emerge several times in evolution through genetic escape in cells.

== Encapsulation without a membrane ==
=== Polyester droplets ===
Tony Jia and Kuhan Chandru have proposed spontaneously-forming membraneless polyester droplets in early cellularization before the innovation of lipid vesicles. Protein function within and RNA function in the presence of certain polyester droplets was shown to be preserved within the droplets. The droplets have scaffolding ability, by allowing lipids to assemble around them; this may have prevented leakage of genetic materials.

=== Proteinoid microspheres ===
Fox observed in the 1960s that proteinoids could form cell-like structures named "proteinoid microspheres". The amino acids had combined to form proteinoids, which formed small globules. These were not cells; their clumps and chains were reminiscent of cyanobacteria, but they contained no functional nucleic acids or other encoded information. Colin Pittendrigh stated in 1967 that "laboratories will be creating a living cell within ten years", a remark that reflected the typical contemporary naivety about the complexity of cell structures.

== Jeewanu protocell ==
A further protocell model is the Jeewanu. First synthesized in 1963 from simple minerals and basic organics while exposed to sunlight, it is reported to have some metabolic capabilities, the presence of a semipermeable membrane, amino acids, phospholipids, carbohydrates and RNA-like molecules. However, the nature and properties of the Jeewanu remains to be clarified. Electrostatic interactions induced by short, positively charged, hydrophobic peptides containing 7 amino acids in length or fewer can attach RNA to a vesicle membrane, the basic cell membrane.

== RNA-DNA world ==
In 2020, coevolution of a RNA-DNA mixture based on diamidophosphate was proposed. The mixture of RNA-DNA sequences, called chimeras, have weak affinity and form weaker duplex structures. This is advantageous in an abiotic scenario and these chimeras have been shown to replicate RNA and DNA – overcoming the "template-product" inhibition problem, where a pure RNA or pure DNA strand is unable to replicate non-enzymatically because it binds too strongly to its partners. This could lead to an abiotic cross-catalytic amplification of RNA and DNA. A continuous chemical reaction network in water and under high-energy radiation can generate precursors for early RNA.

In 2022, evolution experiments of self-replicating RNA showed how RNA may have evolved to diverse complex molecules in RNA world conditions. The RNA evolved to a "replicator network comprising five types of RNAs with diverse interactions" such as cooperation for replication of other members (multiple coexisting host and parasite lineages).

== See also ==
- RNP world
- First universal common ancestor
