= Purificación López-García =

Spanish-born French biologist

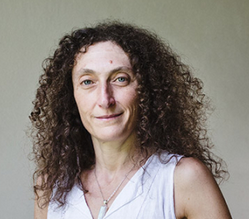
- Puri in 2025
- Born: Madrid, Spain
- Education: Autonomous University of Madrid
- Known for: Microbial diversity & evolution; Archaea genomics; Origin and early evolution of eukaryotes
- Scientific career
- Fields: Microbiology · Microbial ecology · Metagenomics · Geobiology
- Workplaces: CNRS & Université Paris-Saclay
- Website: deemteam.fr

Purificación López-García is a Spanish-born French biologist and research director of Paris-Saclay University who studies the history of life.

== Early life ==
Born in Madrid in September 23, 1965, Purificación "Puri" López García studied biology at Complutense University of Madrid and marine biology at the University of La Laguna, before undertaking a thesis in the Autonomous University of Madrid on the genomic organisation of the halophilic archaeon Haloferax mediterranei, which she defended in 1992. She began her postdoctoral research at Paris-Sud University, Pierre and Marie Curie University and Miguel Hernández University of Elche. She then became assistant professor at the University of Alicante in 2001.

In 2002 López-García joined CNRS (French National Centre for Science) as a researcher. Since 2007 she has been a research director of the CNRS within the Systematic Ecology and Evolution unit at the Paris-Saclay University. She is interested in studying the diversity of life and abiogenesis. As part of the "DEEM" team of scientists she has studied ecological diversity, and the evolution of prokaryotic and eukaryotic microorganisms.

== Research ==
Puri López-García's main research interest is the evolution of life through approaches in microbial ecology and molecular phylogeny. She has contributed to expanding the known diversity of microorganisms in three domains of life (archaea, bacteria, eukaryotes) and to better understand their ecology and evolution.

Her team's work combines classical (culture, microscopy) and molecular (metabarcoding, metagenomics, phylogenomics) approaches in order to research microbial communities in understudied ecosystems, including extreme environments. She holds interdisciplinary collaborations with scientists interested in the abiogenesis, extremophiles, and microorganism-mineral interactions. In 1998, along with David Moreira, she proposed the "syntrophy hypothesis" for eukaryogenesis. Also with Moreira, she has objected to Patrick Forterre's support of the virus world hypothesis

== Awards and Recognitions ==
- 2025 : Member of French Academy of Sciences.
- 2020 : Member of American Society for Microbiology and the Academia Europaea
- 2019 : Member of the European Molecular Biology Organization
- 2017 : Recipient of the CNRS Silver Medal.
- 2015 : Member of the Royal Academy of Science, Letters and Fine Arts of Belgium

== See also ==
- Patrick Forterre
