= RNA world =

Hypothetical stage in the early evolutionary history of life on Earth

A comparison of RNA (left) with DNA (right), showing the helices and nucleobases each employs

The RNA world is a hypothetical stage in the evolutionary history of life on Earth in which self-replicating RNA molecules proliferated before the evolution of DNA and proteins. The term also refers to the hypothesis that posits the existence of this stage. Alexander Rich first proposed the concept of the RNA world in 1962, and Walter Gilbert coined the term in 1986.

Among the characteristics of RNA that suggest its original prominence are that:

- Like DNA, RNA can store and replicate genetic information. Although RNA is considerably more fragile than DNA, some ancient RNAs may have evolved the ability to methylate other RNAs to protect them. The concurrent formation of all four RNA building blocks further strengthens the hypothesis.
- Enzymes made of RNA (ribozymes) can catalyze (start or accelerate) chemical reactions that are critical for life, so it is conceivable that in an RNA world, ribozymes might have preceded enzymes made of protein.
- Many coenzymes that have fundamental roles in cellular life, such as acetyl-CoA, NADH, FADH, and F420, are structurally strikingly similar to RNA and so may be surviving remnants of covalently bound coenzymes in an RNA world.
- One of the most critical components of cells, the ribosome, is composed primarily of RNA.

Although alternative chemical paths to life have been proposed, and RNA-based life may not have been the first life to exist, the RNA world hypothesis seems to be the most favored abiogenesis paradigm. However, even proponents agree that there is still not conclusive evidence to completely falsify other paradigms and hypotheses. Regardless of its plausibility in a prebiotic scenario, the RNA world can serve as a model system for studying the origin of life.

If the RNA world existed, it was probably followed by an age characterized by the evolution of ribonucleoproteins (RNP world), which in turn ushered in the era of DNA and longer proteins. DNA has greater stability and durability than RNA, which may explain why it became the predominant information storage molecule. Protein enzymes may have replaced RNA-based ribozymes as biocatalysts because the greater abundance and diversity of the monomers of which they are built makes them more versatile. As some cofactors contain both nucleotide and amino-acid characteristics, it may be that amino acids, peptides, and finally proteins initially were cofactors for ribozymes.

== History ==
One of the challenges in studying abiogenesis is that the system of reproduction and metabolism utilized by all extant life involves three distinct types of interdependent macromolecules (DNA, RNA, and proteins), none of which can function and reproduce without the others, the classic chicken-and-egg paradox. This suggests that life could not have arisen in its current form, which has led researchers to hypothesize mechanisms whereby the current system might have arisen from a simpler precursor system. American molecular biologist Alexander Rich was the first to posit a coherent hypothesis on the origin of nucleotides as precursors of life. In a 1962 article he explained that the primitive Earth's environment could have produced RNA molecules (polynucleotide monomers) that eventually acquired enzymatic and self-replicating functions.

Other mentions of RNA as a primordial molecule can be found in papers by Francis Crick and Leslie Orgel, as well as in Carl Woese's 1967 book The Genetic Code. Hans Kuhn in 1972 laid out a possible process by which the modern genetic system might have arisen from a nucleotide-based precursor, and this led Harold White in 1976 to observe that many of the cofactors essential for enzymatic function are either nucleotides or could have been derived from nucleotides. He proposed a scenario whereby the critical electrochemistry of enzymatic reactions would have necessitated retention of the specific nucleotide moieties of the original RNA-based enzymes carrying out the reactions, while the remaining structural elements of the enzymes were gradually replaced by protein, until all that remained of the original RNAs were these nucleotide cofactors, "fossils of nucleic acid enzymes".

== Properties of RNA ==
The properties of RNA make the idea of the RNA world hypothesis conceptually plausible, though its general acceptance as an explanation for the origin of life requires further evidence. RNA is known to form efficient catalysts, and its similarity to DNA makes clear its ability to store information. Opinions differ, however, as to whether RNA constituted the first autonomous self-replicating system or was a derivative of a still-earlier system. One version of the hypothesis is that a different type of nucleic acid, termed pre-RNA, was the first one to emerge as a self-reproducing molecule, to be replaced by RNA only later. On the other hand, the discovery in 2009 that activated pyrimidine ribonucleotides can be synthesized under plausible prebiotic conditions suggests that it is premature to dismiss the RNA-first scenarios. Suggestions for 'simple' pre-RNA nucleic acids have included peptide nucleic acid (PNA), threose nucleic acid (TNA) or glycol nucleic acid (GNA). Despite their structural simplicity and possession of properties comparable with RNA, the chemically plausible generation of "simpler" nucleic acids under prebiotic conditions has yet to be demonstrated.

=== RNA as an enzyme ===
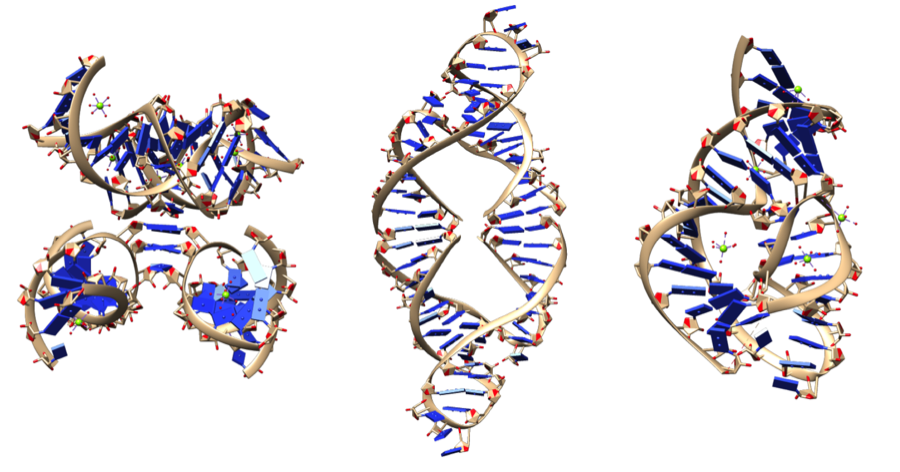
Various ribozyme structures

In the 1980s, RNA structures capable of self-processing were discovered, with the RNA moiety of ribonuclease P acting as its catalytic subunit. These catalytic RNAs – referred to as RNA enzymes, or ribozymes – are found in today's DNA-based life and could be examples of living fossils. Ribozymes play vital roles, such as that of the ribosome. The large subunit of the ribosome includes an rRNA responsible for the peptide bond-forming peptidyl transferase activity of protein synthesis. Many other ribozyme activities exist; for example, the hammerhead ribozyme performs self-cleavage and an RNA polymerase ribozyme can synthesize a short RNA strand from a primed RNA template.

Among the enzymatic properties important for the beginning of life are:

Self-replication
The ability to self-replicate or synthesize other RNA molecules; relatively short RNA molecules that can synthesize others have been artificially produced in the lab. The shortest was 165 bases long, though it has been estimated that only part of the molecule was crucial for this function.
- One version, 189 bases long, had an error rate of just 1.1% per nucleotide when synthesizing an 11-nucleotide long RNA strand from primed template strands. This 189-base pair ribozyme could polymerize a template of at most 14 nucleotides in length, which is too short for self-replication, but is a potential lead for further investigation. The longest primer extension performed by a ribozyme polymerase was 20 bases.
- In 2016, researchers reported the use of in vitro evolution to improve dramatically the activity and generality of an RNA polymerase ribozyme by selecting variants that can synthesize functional RNA molecules from an RNA template. Each RNA polymerase ribozyme was engineered to remain linked to its new, synthesized RNA strand; this allowed the team to isolate successful polymerases. The isolated RNA polymerases were again used for another round of evolution. After several rounds of evolution, they obtained one RNA polymerase ribozyme called 24-3 that was able to copy almost any other RNA, from small catalysts to long RNA-based enzymes. Particular RNAs were amplified up to 10,000 times, a first RNA version of the polymerase chain reaction (PCR).
Life is thought to have emerged from inanimate matter more than 3.5 billion years ago when a rudimentary abiogenesis process gradually evolved into an autocatalytic process capable of template-based replication. It was proposed on the basis of experimentally feasible RNA reactions catalyzed by a ribozyme, that the emergence of life was likely a gradual process involving the evolutionary properties of variation, heredity and reproduction, ultimately allowing for Darwinian evolution.
Recent efforts have been directed at trying to demonstrate RNA replication under conditions that assume the presence during early evolution of plausible nucleotide intermediates and plausible environmental conditions that could favor strand replication alternating with strand separation. One such effort was the demonstration of high fidelity RNA copying using 2′,3′-cyclic phosphate ligation to allow polynucleotide synthesis under conditions also compatible with strand separation. In another study, it was shown that in a model oscillating Hadean environment likely to have been abundant during early evolution, that ribozyme-mediated RNA synthesis and replication can occur.
Catalysis
The ability to catalyze simple chemical reactions—which would enhance creation of molecules that are building blocks of RNA molecules (i.e., a strand of RNA that would make creating more strands of RNA easier). Relatively short RNA molecules with such abilities have been artificially formed in the lab. A recent study showed that almost any nucleic acid can evolve into a catalytic sequence under appropriate selection. For instance, an arbitrarily chosen 50-nucleotide DNA fragment encoding for the Bos taurus (cattle) albumin mRNA was subjected to test-tube evolution to derive a catalytic DNA (a deoxyribozyme, also called a DNAzyme) with RNA-cleavage activity. After only a few weeks, a DNAzyme with significant catalytic activity had evolved. In general, DNA is much more chemically inert than RNA and hence much more resistant to obtaining catalytic properties. If in vitro evolution works for DNA it will happen much more easily with RNA. In 2022, Nick Lane and coauthors showed in a computational simulation that short RNA sequences could have been capable of catalyzing CO_{2} fixation which supported protocell replication and growth.
Amino acid-RNA ligation
The ability to conjugate an amino acid to the 3′-end of an RNA in order to use its chemical groups or provide a long-branched aliphatic sidechain. It has been suggested that amino acids may have initially been involved with RNA molecules as cofactors enhancing or diversifying their enzymatic capabilities, before evolving into more complex peptides. In today's world, this is most commonly seen in the form of aminoacyl-tRNA.
Peptide bond formation
The ability to catalyse the formation of peptide bonds between amino acids to produce short peptides or longer proteins. This is done in modern cells by ribosomes, a complex of several RNA molecules known as rRNA together with many proteins. The rRNA molecules are thought responsible for its enzymatic activity, as no amino-acid residues lie within 18Å of the enzyme's active site, and, when the majority of the amino-acid residues in the ribosome were stringently removed, the resulting ribosome retained its full peptidyl transferase activity, fully able to catalyze the formation of peptide bonds between amino acids.
- A pseudo 2 fold symmetry of the region surrounding the peptidyl transferase center (PTC) led to the hypothesis of the Proto-Ribosome, that a vestige of an ancient dimeric molecule from the RNA world is functioning within the ribosome. An RNA molecule derived from the 23S ribosomal RNA sequence for this region has been synthesized in the lab in 2022 to test the proto-ribosome hypothesis. It was able to dimerize and to form peptide bonds.
- A much shorter RNA molecule has been synthesized in the laboratory in 1999 with the ability to form peptide bonds, and it has been suggested that rRNA has evolved from a similar molecule.
- tRNA is suggested to have also evolved from RNA molecules that began to catalyze amino acid transfer (also see the discussion of amino acid-RNA ligation above). The current core of the ribosome, the PTC, may also have evolved from the concatenation of five proto-tRNAs.
  - A RNP world-type hypothesis is that the tRNA acceptor stem and the catalytic domain of the aaRS came earlier than the genetic code and the PTC.

==== Cofactors ====
Protein enzymes catalyze various chemical reactions, but over half of them incorporate cofactors to facilitate and diversify their catalytic activities. Cofactors are essential in biology, as they are based largely on nucleotides rather than amino acids. Ribozymes use nucleotide cofactors to create metabolism, with two basic choices: non-covalent binding or covalent attachment. Both approaches have been demonstrated using directed evolution to reinvent RNA dupes of protein-catalyzed processes. Lorsch and Szostak investigated ribozymes that could phosphorylate themselves and use ATP-γS as a substrate. However, only one of the seven classes of selected ribozymes had detectable ATP affinity, indicating that the ability to bind ATP was compromised. NAD^{+}- dependent redox ribozymes were also evaluated. The selected ribozyme had a rate of enhancement of more than 10^{7} fold and was proven to catalyze the reverse reaction - benzaldehyde reduction by NADH. Since the usage of adenosine as a cofactor is prevalent in current metabolism and is likely to have been common in the RNA world, these discoveries are essential for the evolution of metabolism in the RNA world.

=== RNA in information storage ===
RNA is a very similar molecule to DNA, with only two significant chemical differences (the backbone of RNA uses ribose instead of deoxyribose and its nucleobases include uracil instead of thymine). The overall structure of RNA and DNA are immensely similar—one strand of DNA and one of RNA can bind to form a double helical structure. This makes the storage of information in RNA possible in a very similar way to the storage of information in DNA. However, RNA is less stable, being more prone to hydrolysis due to the presence of a hydroxyl group at the ribose 2' position.

The major difference between RNA and DNA is the presence of a hydroxyl group at the 2'-position.

==== Comparison of DNA and RNA structure ====
The major difference between RNA and DNA is the presence of a hydroxyl group at the 2'-position of the ribose sugar in RNA (illustration, right). This group makes the molecule less stable because, when not constrained in a double helix, the 2' hydroxyl can chemically attack the adjacent phosphodiester bond to cleave the phosphodiester backbone. The hydroxyl group also forces the ribose into the C3'-endo sugar conformation unlike the C2'-endo conformation of the deoxyribose sugar in DNA. This forces an RNA double helix to change from a B-DNA structure to one more closely resembling A-DNA.

RNA also uses a different set of bases than DNA—adenine, guanine, cytosine and uracil, instead of adenine, guanine, cytosine and thymine. Chemically, uracil is similar to thymine, differing only by a methyl group, and its production requires less energy. In terms of base pairing, this has no effect. Adenine readily binds uracil or thymine. Uracil is, however, one product of damage to cytosine that makes RNA particularly susceptible to mutations that can replace a GC base pair with a GU (wobble) or AU base pair.

RNA is thought to have preceded DNA, because of their ordering in the biosynthetic pathways. The deoxyribonucleotides used to make DNA are made from ribonucleotides, the building blocks of RNA, by removing the 2'-hydroxyl group. As a consequence, a cell must have the ability to make RNA before it can make DNA.

==== Limitations of information storage in RNA ====
The chemical properties of RNA make large RNA molecules inherently fragile, and they can easily be broken down into their constituent nucleotides through hydrolysis. These limitations do not make use of RNA as an information storage system impossible, simply energy intensive (to repair or replace damaged RNA molecules) and prone to mutation. While this makes it unsuitable for current 'DNA optimised' life, it may have been acceptable for more primitive life.

=== RNA as a regulator ===
Riboswitches have been found to act as regulators of gene expression, particularly in bacteria, but also in plants and archaea. Riboswitches alter their secondary structure in response to the binding of a metabolite. Riboswitch classes have highly conserved aptamer domains, even among diverse organisms. When a target metabolite is bound to this aptamer, conformational changes occur, modulating the expression of genes carried by mRNA. These changes occur in an expression platform, located downstream from the aptamer. This change in structure can result in the formation or disruption of a terminator, truncating or permitting transcription respectively. Alternatively, riboswitches may bind or occlude the Shine–Dalgarno sequence, affecting translation. It has been suggested that these originated in an RNA-based world. In addition, RNA thermometers regulate gene expression in response to temperature changes.

== Support and difficulties ==
The RNA world hypothesis is supported by RNA's ability to store, transmit, and duplicate genetic information, as DNA does, and to perform enzymatic reactions, like protein-based enzymes. Because it can carry out the types of tasks now performed by proteins and DNA, RNA is believed to have once been capable of supporting independent life on its own. Some viruses use RNA as their genetic material, rather than DNA. Further, while nucleotides were not found in experiments based on Miller-Urey experiment, their formation in prebiotically plausible conditions was reported in 2009; a purine base, adenine, is merely a pentamer of hydrogen cyanide, and it happens that this particular base is used as omnipresent energy vehicle in the cell: adenosine triphosphate is used everywhere in preference to guanosine triphosphate, cytidine triphosphate, uridine triphosphate or even deoxythymidine triphosphate, which could serve just as well but are practically never used except as building blocks for nucleic acid chains. Experiments with basic ribozymes, like Bacteriophage Qβ RNA, have shown that simple self-replicating RNA structures can withstand even strong selective pressures (e.g., opposite-chirality chain terminators).

Since there were no known chemical pathways for the abiogenic synthesis of nucleotides from pyrimidine nucleobases cytosine and uracil under prebiotic conditions, it is thought by some that nucleic acids did not contain these nucleobases seen in life's nucleic acids. The nucleoside cytosine has a half-life in isolation of 19 days at 100 °C (212 °F) and 17,000 years in freezing water, which some argue is too short on the geologic time scale for accumulation. Others have questioned whether ribose and other backbone sugars could be stable enough to be found in the original genetic material, and have raised the issue that all ribose molecules would have had to be the same enantiomer, as any nucleotide of the wrong chirality acts as a chain terminator.

Pyrimidine ribonucleosides and their respective nucleotides have been prebiotically synthesised by a sequence of reactions that by-pass free sugars and assemble in a stepwise fashion by including nitrogenous and oxygenous chemistries. In a series of publications, John Sutherland and his team at the School of Chemistry, University of Manchester, have demonstrated high yielding routes to cytidine and uridine ribonucleotides built from small 2- and 3-carbon fragments such as glycolaldehyde, glyceraldehyde or glyceraldehyde-3-phosphate, cyanamide, and cyanoacetylene. One of the steps in this sequence allows the isolation of enantiopure ribose aminooxazoline if the enantiomeric excess of glyceraldehyde is 60% or greater, of possible interest toward biological homochirality. This can be viewed as a prebiotic purification step, where the said compound spontaneously crystallised out from a mixture of the other pentose aminooxazolines. Aminooxazolines can react with cyanoacetylene in a mild and highly efficient manner, controlled by inorganic phosphate, to give the cytidine ribonucleotides. Photoanomerization with UV light allows for inversion about the 1' anomeric centre to give the correct beta stereochemistry; one problem with this chemistry is the selective phosphorylation of alpha-cytidine at the 2' position. However, in 2009, they showed that the same simple building blocks allow access, via phosphate controlled nucleobase elaboration, to 2',3'-cyclic pyrimidine nucleotides directly, which are known to be able to polymerise into RNA. Organic chemist Donna Blackmond described this finding as "strong evidence" in favour of the RNA world. However, John Sutherland said that while his team's work suggests that nucleic acids played an early and central role in the origin of life, it did not necessarily support the RNA world hypothesis in the strict sense, which he described as a "restrictive, hypothetical arrangement".

The Sutherland group's 2009 paper also highlighted the possibility for the photo-sanitization of the pyrimidine-2',3'-cyclic phosphates. A potential weakness of these routes is the generation of enantioenriched glyceraldehyde, or its 3-phosphate derivative (glyceraldehyde prefers to exist as its keto tautomer dihydroxyacetone).

On August 8, 2011, a report, based on NASA studies with meteorites found on Earth, was published suggesting building blocks of RNA (adenine, guanine, and related organic molecules) may have been formed in outer space. In 2017, research using a numerical model suggested that a RNA world may have emerged in warm ponds on the early Earth, and that meteorites were a plausible and probable source of the RNA building blocks (ribose and nucleic acids) to these environments. On August 29, 2012, astronomers at Copenhagen University reported the detection of a specific sugar molecule, glycolaldehyde, in a distant star system. The molecule was found around the protostellar binary IRAS 16293-2422, which is located 400 light years from Earth. Because glycolaldehyde is needed to form RNA, this finding suggests that complex organic molecules may form in stellar systems prior to the formation of planets, eventually arriving on young planets early in their formation. Nitriles, key molecular precursors of the RNA World scenario, are among the most abundant chemical families in the universe and have been found in molecular clouds in the center of the Milky Way, protostars of different masses, meteorites and comets, and also in the atmosphere of Titan, the largest moon of Saturn.

A study in 2001 shows that nicotinic acid and its precursor, quinolinic acid can be "produced in yields as high as 7% in a six-step nonenzymatic sequence from aspartic acid and dihydroxyacetone phosphate (DHAP). The biosynthesis of ribose phosphate could have produced DHAP and other three carbon compounds. Aspartic acid could have been available from prebiotic synthesis or from the ribozyme synthesis of pyrimidines." This supports that NAD could have originated in the RNA world. RNA sequences at lengths of 30 nucleotides, 60 nucleotides, 100 nucleotides, and 140 nucleotides, were capable of catalysis of "the synthesis of three common coenzymes, CoA, NAD, and FAD, from their precursors, 4'-phosphopantetheine, NMN, and FMN, respectively".

== Prebiotic RNA synthesis ==
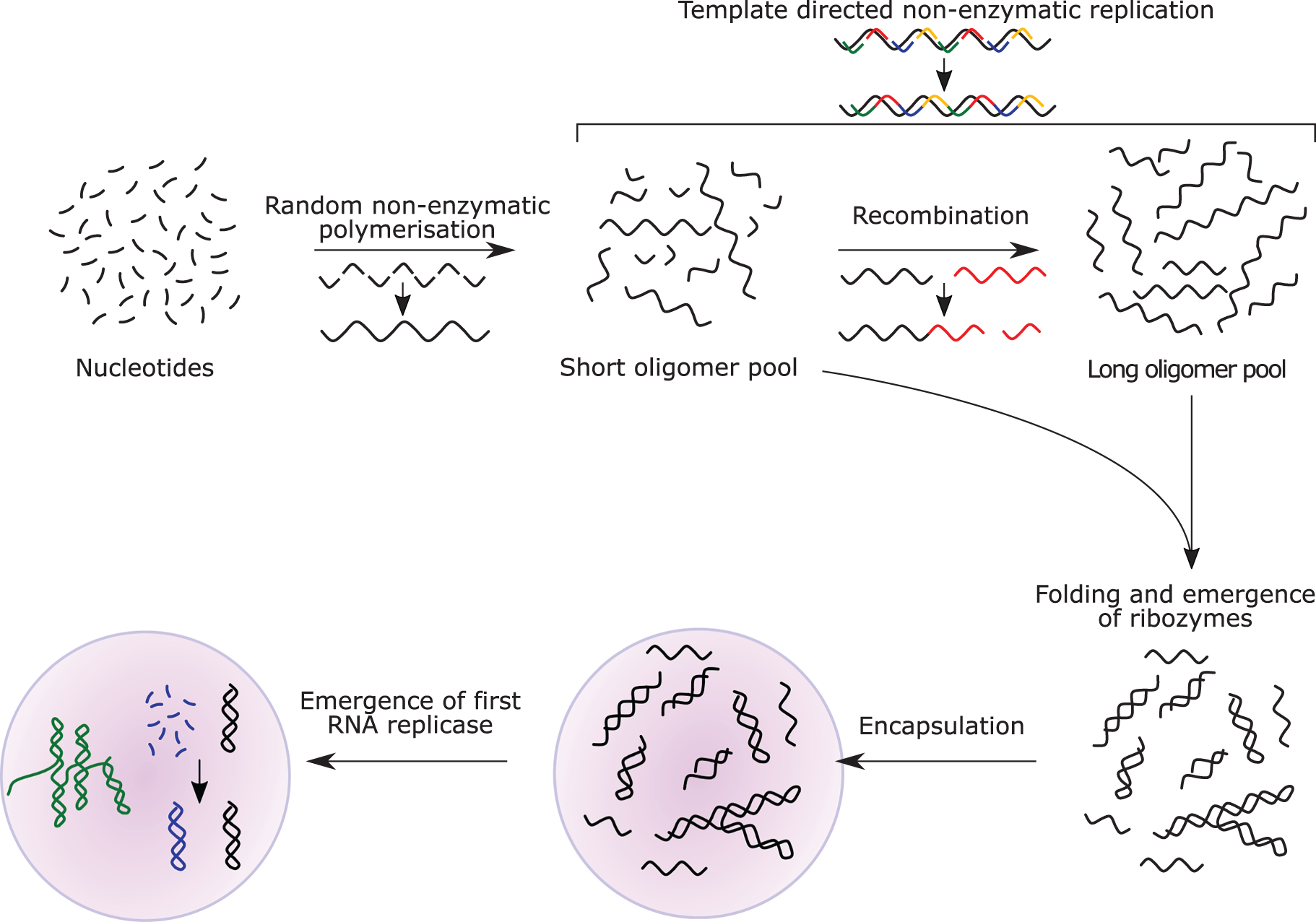
The RNA world hypothesis proposes that spontaneous polymerization of ribonucleotides led to the emergence of ribozymes and including an RNA replicase.

Nucleotides are the fundamental molecules that combine in series to form RNA. They consist of a nitrogenous base attached to a sugar-phosphate backbone. RNA is made of long stretches of specific nucleotides arranged so that their sequence of bases carries information. The RNA world hypothesis holds that in the primordial soup (or sandwich), there existed free-floating nucleotides. These nucleotides regularly formed bonds with one another, which often broke because the change in energy was so low. However, certain sequences of base pairs have catalytic properties that lower the energy of their chain being created, enabling them to stay together for longer periods of time. As each chain grew longer, it attracted more matching nucleotides faster, causing chains to now form faster than they were breaking down.

These chains have been proposed by some as the first, primitive forms of life. In an RNA world, different sets of RNA strands would have had different replication outputs, which would have increased or decreased their frequency in the population, i.e., natural selection. As the fittest sets of RNA molecules expanded their numbers, novel catalytic properties added by mutation, which benefitted their persistence and expansion, could accumulate in the population. Such an autocatalytic set of ribozymes, capable of self-replication in about an hour, has been identified. It was produced by molecular competition (in vitro evolution) of candidate enzyme mixtures.

Competition between RNA may have favored the emergence of cooperation between different RNA chains, opening the way for the formation of the first protocell. Eventually, RNA chains developed with catalytic properties that help amino acids bind together (a process called peptide-bonding). These amino acids could then assist with RNA synthesis, giving those RNA chains that could serve as ribozymes the selective advantage. The ability to catalyze one step in protein synthesis, aminoacylation of RNA, has been demonstrated in a short (five-nucleotide) segment of RNA.

In 2014, a group of researchers managed to produce all four components of RNA by simulating an asteroid impact in primordial conditions. In March 2015, NASA scientists reported that, for the first time, complex DNA and RNA organic compounds of life, including uracil, cytosine, and thymine, have been formed in the laboratory under conditions found only in outer space, using starting chemicals, like pyrimidine, found in meteorites. Pyrimidine, like polycyclic aromatic hydrocarbons (PAHs), may have been formed in red giant stars or in interstellar dust and gas clouds, according to the scientists. That same month, researchers were able to produce over 50 aminoacids in a laboratory setting by using only hydrogen sulfide, hydrogen cyanide (presumably produced after outer space meteorites reacted with atmospheric nitrogen) and ultraviolet light.

In 2018, researchers at Georgia Institute of Technology identified three molecular candidates for the bases that might have formed an earliest version of proto-RNA: barbituric acid, melamine, and 2,4,6-triaminopyrimidine (TAP). These three molecules are simpler versions of the four bases in current RNA, which could have been present in larger amounts and could still be forward-compatible with them but may have been discarded by evolution in exchange for more optimal base pairs. Specifically, TAP can form nucleotides with a large range of sugars. Both TAP and melamine base pair with barbituric acid. All three spontaneously form nucleotides with ribose.

A 2024 study synthesized a 45-nucleotide polymerase ribozyme named QT45, discovered from random sequence pools, that catalyzes general RNA-templated RNA synthesis. It can synthesize both its complementary strand and a copy of itself with fair accuracy. The authors speculate that polymerase ribozymes are more abundant in RNA sequence space than previously thought.

== Evolution of DNA ==
One of the challenges posed by the RNA world hypothesis is to discover the pathway by which an RNA-based system transitioned to one based on DNA. Geoffrey Diemer and Ken Stedman, at Portland State University in Oregon, may have found a solution. While conducting a survey of viruses in a hot acidic lake in Lassen Volcanic National Park, California, they uncovered evidence that a simple DNA virus had acquired a gene from a completely unrelated RNA-based virus. Virologist Luis P. Villarreal of the University of California Irvine also suggests that viruses capable of converting an RNA-based gene into DNA and then incorporating it into a more complex DNA-based genome might have been common in the virus world during the RNA to DNA transition some 4 billion years ago. This finding bolsters the argument for the transfer of information from the RNA world to the emerging DNA world before the emergence of the last universal common ancestor. From the research, the diversity of this virus world is still with us.

== Viroids ==
Additional evidence supporting the concept of an RNA world has resulted from research on viroids, the first representatives of a novel domain of "subviral pathogens". Viroids infect plants, where most are pathogens, and consist of short stretches of highly complementary, circular, single-stranded and non-coding RNA without a protein coat. They are extremely small, ranging from 246 to 467 nucleobases, compared to the smallest known viruses capable of causing an infection, with genomes about 2,000 nucleobases in length.

Based on their characteristic properties, in 1989 plant biologist Theodor Diener argued that viroids are more plausible living relics of the RNA world than introns and other RNAs considered candidates at the time. Diener's hypothesis would be expanded by the research group of Ricardo Flores, and gained a broader audience when in 2014, a New York Times science writer published a popularized version of the proposal.

The characteristics of viroids highlighted as consistent with an RNA world were their small size, high guanine and cytosine content, circular structure, structural periodicity, the lack of protein-coding ability and, in some cases, ribozyme-mediated replication. One aspect critics of the hypothesis have focused on is that the exclusive hosts of all known viroids, angiosperms, did not evolve until billions of years after the RNA world was replaced, making viroids more likely to have arisen through later evolutionary mechanisms unrelated to the RNA world than to have survived via a cryptic host over that extended period. Whether they are relics of that world or of more recent origin, their function as autonomous naked RNA is seen as analogous to that envisioned for an RNA world.

== Origin of sexual reproduction ==
Eigen et al. and Woese proposed that the genomes of early protocells were composed of single-stranded RNA, and that individual genes corresponded to separate RNA segments, rather than being linked end-to-end as in present-day DNA genomes. A protocell that was haploid (one copy of each RNA gene) would be vulnerable to damage, since a single lesion in any RNA segment would be potentially lethal to the protocell (e.g., by blocking replication or inhibiting the function of an essential gene).

Vulnerability to damage could be reduced by maintaining two or more copies of each RNA segment in each protocell, i.e., by maintaining diploidy or polyploidy. Genome redundancy would allow a damaged RNA segment to be replaced by an additional replication of its homolog. However, for such a simple organism, the proportion of available resources tied up in the genetic material would be a large fraction of the total resource budget. Under limited resource conditions, the protocell reproductive rate would likely be inversely related to ploidy number. The protocell's fitness would be reduced by the costs of redundancy. Consequently, coping with damaged RNA genes while minimizing the costs of redundancy would likely have been a fundamental problem for early protocells.

A cost-benefit analysis was carried out in which the costs of maintaining redundancy were balanced against the costs of genome damage. This analysis led to the conclusion that, under a wide range of circumstances, the selected strategy would be for each protocell to be haploid, but to periodically fuse with another haploid protocell to form a transient diploid. The retention of the haploid state maximizes the growth rate. The periodic fusions permit mutual reactivation of otherwise lethally damaged protocells. If at least one damage-free copy of each RNA gene is present in the transient diploid, viable progeny can be formed. For two, rather than one, viable daughter cells to be produced would require an extra replication of the intact RNA gene homologous to any RNA gene that had been damaged prior to the division of the fused protocell. The cycle of haploid reproduction, with occasional fusion to a transient diploid state, followed by splitting to the haploid state, can be considered to be the sexual cycle in its most primitive form. In the absence of this sexual cycle, haploid protocells with damage in an essential RNA gene would simply die.

This model for the early sexual cycle is hypothetical, but it is very similar to the known sexual behavior of the segmented RNA viruses, which are among the simplest organisms known. Influenza virus, whose genome consists of 8 physically separated single-stranded RNA segments, is an example of this type of virus. In segmented RNA viruses, "mating" can occur when a host cell is infected by at least two virus particles. If these viruses each contain an RNA segment with a lethal damage, multiple infection can lead to reactivation providing that at least one undamaged copy of each virus gene is present in the infected cell. This phenomenon is known as "multiplicity reactivation". Multiplicity reactivation has been reported to occur in influenza virus infections after induction of RNA damage by UV-irradiation, and ionizing radiation.

== Further developments ==
Patrick Forterre has been working on a novel hypothesis, called "three viruses, three domains": that viruses were instrumental in the transition from RNA to DNA and the evolution of Bacteria, Archaea, and Eukaryota. He believes the last universal common ancestor was RNA-based and evolved RNA viruses. Some of the viruses evolved into DNA viruses to protect their genes from attack. Through the process of viral infection into hosts the three domains of life evolved.

Another interesting proposal is the idea that RNA synthesis might have been driven by temperature gradients, in the process of thermosynthesis. Single nucleotides have been shown to catalyze organic reactions.

Steven Benner has argued that chemical conditions on the planet Mars, such as the presence of boron, molybdenum, and oxygen, may have been better for initially producing RNA molecules than those on Earth. If so, life-suitable molecules, originating on Mars, may have later migrated to Earth via mechanisms of panspermia or similar process.

== Alternative hypotheses ==
The hypothesized existence of an RNA world does not exclude a "Pre-RNA world", where a metabolic system based on a different nucleic acid is proposed to pre-date RNA. A candidate nucleic acid is peptide nucleic acid (PNA), which uses simple peptide bonds to link nucleobases.

An alternative—or complementary—theory of RNA origin is proposed in the PAH world hypothesis, whereby polycyclic aromatic hydrocarbons (PAHs) mediate the synthesis of RNA molecules. PAHs are the most common and abundant of the known polyatomic molecules in the visible Universe and are a likely constituent of the primordial sea. PAHs and fullerenes (also implicated in the origin of life) have been detected in nebulae.

Some of the difficulties of producing the precursors on earth are bypassed by another alternative or complementary theory for their origin, panspermia. It discusses the possibility that the earliest life on this planet was carried here from somewhere else in the galaxy, possibly on meteorites similar to the Murchison meteorite. Sugar molecules, including ribose, have been found in meteorites.

=== RNA-peptide coevolution ===
Another proposal is that the dual-molecule system we see today, where a nucleotide-based molecule is needed to synthesize protein, and a peptide-based (protein) molecule is needed to make nucleic acid polymers, represents the original form of life. This theory is called RNA-peptide coevolution, or the Peptide-RNA world, and offers a possible explanation for the rapid evolution of high-quality replication in RNA (since proteins are catalysts), with the disadvantage of having to postulate the coincident formation of two complex molecules, an enzyme (from peptides) and a RNA (from nucleotides). In this Peptide-RNA World scenario, RNA would have contained the instructions for life, while peptides (simple protein enzymes) would have accelerated key chemical reactions to carry out those instructions. The study leaves open the question of exactly how those primitive systems managed to replicate themselves — something neither the RNA World hypothesis nor the Peptide-RNA World theory can yet explain, unless polymerases (enzymes that rapidly assemble the RNA molecule) played a role.

A research project completed in March 2015 by the Sutherland group found that a network of reactions beginning with hydrogen cyanide and hydrogen sulfide, in streams of water irradiated by UV light, could produce the chemical components of proteins and lipids, alongside those of RNA. The researchers used the term "cyanosulfidic" to describe this network of reactions. In November 2017, a team at the Scripps Research Institute identified reactions involving the compound diamidophosphate which could have linked the chemical components into short peptide and lipid chains as well as short RNA-like chains of nucleotides.

== Implications ==
The RNA world hypothesis, if true, has important implications for the definition of life and the origin of life. For most of the time that followed Franklin, Watson and Crick's elucidation of DNA structure in 1953, life was largely defined in terms of DNA and proteins: DNA and proteins seemed the dominant macromolecules in the living cell, with RNA only aiding in creating proteins from the DNA blueprint.

The RNA world hypothesis places RNA at center-stage when life originated. The RNA world hypothesis is supported by the observations that ribosomes are ribozymes: the catalytic site is composed of RNA, and proteins hold no major structural role and are of peripheral functional importance. This was confirmed with the deciphering of the 3-dimensional structure of the ribosome in 2001. Specifically, peptide bond formation, the reaction that binds amino acids together into proteins, is now known to be catalyzed by an adenine residue in the rRNA.

RNAs are known to play roles in other cellular catalytic processes, specifically in the targeting of enzymes to specific RNA sequences. In eukaryotes, the processing of pre-mRNA and RNA editing take place at sites determined by the base pairing between the target RNA and RNA constituents of small nuclear ribonucleoproteins (snRNPs). Such enzyme targeting is also responsible for gene down regulation through RNA interference (RNAi), where an enzyme-associated guide RNA targets specific mRNA for selective destruction. Likewise, in eukaryotes the maintenance of telomeres involves copying of an RNA template that is a constituent part of the telomerase ribonucleoprotein enzyme. Another cellular organelle, the vault, includes a ribonucleoprotein component, although the function of this organelle remains to be elucidated.

== See also ==
- GADV-protein world hypothesis
- The Major Transitions in Evolution
- RNA-based evolution
- Protocell or Pre-cell, the primordial version of a cell which confined RNA and later, DNA
- First universal common ancestor (FUCA)
- Origin of DNA
