= Origin of DNA =

Scientific hypotheses on the origin and evolution of DNA

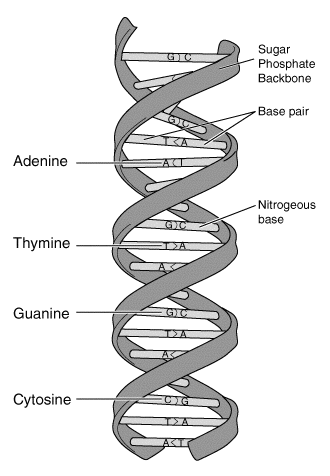
The nucleotide bases of DNA

Origin of life timeline
← / Earliest Universe; ← / Earliest stars; ← / Earliest galaxy; ← / Milky Way spirals; ← / Earth / Solar System; ← / LUCA; ← / Earliest fossils; ← / Earliest oxygen; ← / Atmospheric oxygen; ← / Sexual reproduction; ← / Cambrian explosion
(billion years ago)

The origin of DNA encompasses the scientific theories and discoveries surrounding the emergence of deoxyribonucleic acid (DNA) as the primary genetic material for all known forms of life. DNA contains the genetic information that allows organisms to function, grow, and reproduce. However, the exact timeline and mechanisms by which DNA assumed this role during the 4-billion-year history of life remain active areas of scientific inquiry. While the last universal common ancestor (LUCA) is thought to have possessed DNA, it is currently widely proposed that the earliest forms of life may have relied on RNA as their genetic material, with DNA evolving later as a more chemically stable repository for genetic information.

== History ==
Research into the origins of DNA is fundamentally constrained by the lack of direct physical evidence of ancient genetic systems. Investigating the early evolution of nucleic acids is notoriously difficult because DNA survives in the natural environment for less than one million years. Once an organism dies, its DNA slowly degrades into short fragments in solution, making the recovery of DNA from most ancient fossils impossible.

While claims for older DNA have been made in the literature, they are met with significant skepticism within the scientific community. Notably, a 2000 report claimed the isolation of a viable bacterium from a salt crystal that was 250 million years old. These claims remain highly controversial, with subsequent studies strongly suggesting that the recovered DNA was likely the result of modern environmental contamination. Because empirical fossil evidence of the first DNA is unavailable, researchers must rely on studying extant molecular biology, viral genetics, and astrochemistry to piece together how the molecule originated.

== Extraterrestrial origins ==
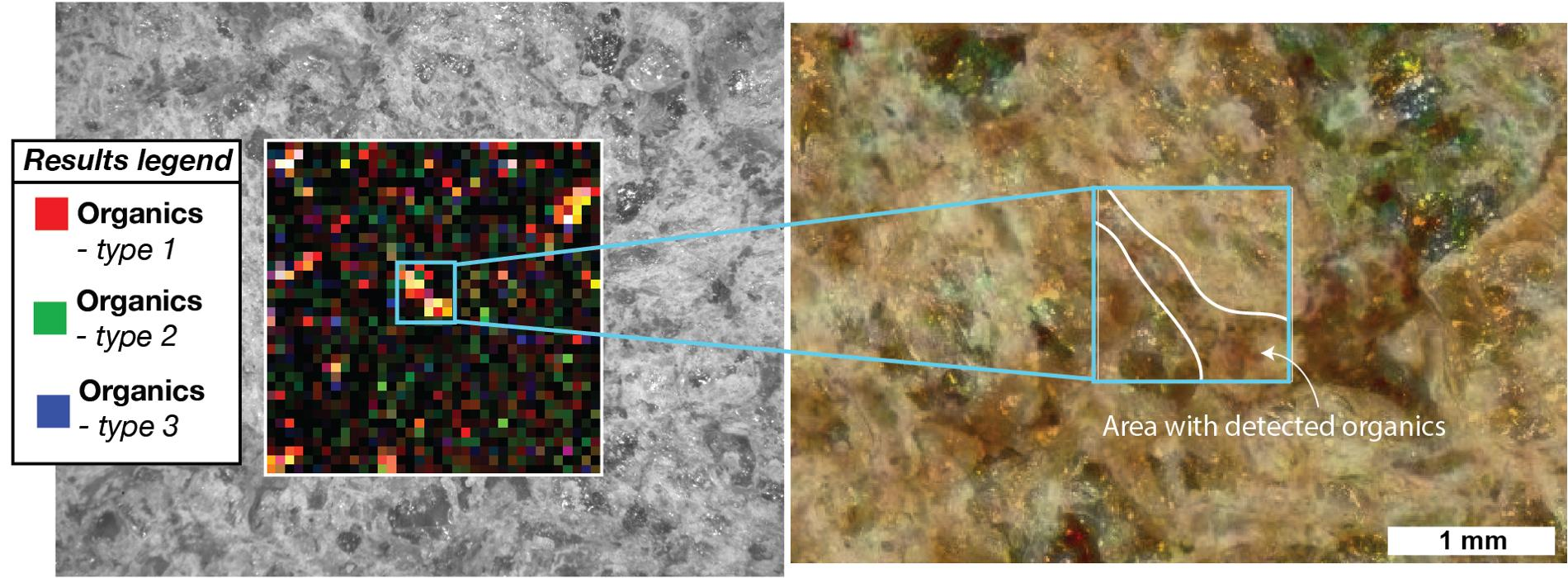
Carbon-based molecules most likely formed by geological processes on Mars. Captured by Perseverance

The foundational components of DNA may have an extraterrestrial origin. Astrobiological research has shown that the building blocks of DNA, including adenine, guanine, and related organic molecules, can form in outer space. In 2022, scientists confirmed that all five primary nucleobases for DNA and RNA (including the pyrimidines uracil, cytosine, and thymine) are present in carbonaceous meteorites.

Complex organic compounds essential for life have also been synthesized in the laboratory under conditions mimicking those found in outer space. By using starting chemicals like pyrimidine, which is found in meteorites, researchers have successfully formed uracil, cytosine, and thymine. Pyrimidine, similar to polycyclic aromatic hydrocarbons (PAHs), which are among the most carbon-rich chemicals found in the universe, may have originally formed in the atmospheres of red giants or within interstellar cosmic dust and gas clouds. These findings suggest that the prebiotic chemical ingredients necessary for the emergence of DNA could have been delivered to early Earth by meteoritic impacts.

== Transition from RNA world ==
RNA (left) and DNA (right)

Under the RNA world hypothesis, early life forms used RNA rather than DNA as their central genetic material. RNA is uniquely suited for early cell metabolism because it is capable of both transmitting genetic information and catalyzing chemical reactions (acting as ribozymes). This ancient RNA world likely influenced the evolution of the current genetic code, which is based on four nucleotide bases. The limitation to four bases is thought to be an evolutionary trade-off: a small number of bases increases the accuracy of genetic replication, while a larger number of bases would have increased the catalytic efficiency and versatility of ribozymes.

One of the primary challenges posed by the RNA world hypothesis is explaining the exact evolutionary pathway by which an RNA-based biological system transitioned to a DNA-based one. The study of modern viruses has provided significant insights into this transition. Researchers Geoffrey Diemer and Ken Stedman from Portland State University discovered potential evidence of this pathway while conducting a virological survey in a hot acidic lake in Lassen Volcanic National Park, California. They uncovered a simple DNA virus that had naturally acquired a gene from a completely unrelated RNA-based virus, demonstrating that functional genetic chimeras can occur between the two nucleic acid domains.

Building on such mechanisms, virologist Luis P. Villarreal of UC Irvine, has suggested that viruses played a critical evolutionary role in the creation of DNA genomes. According to Villarreal, viruses capable of converting RNA-based genes into DNA and incorporating them into more complex DNA-based genomes might have been highly common in the ancient "virus world." This RNA-to-DNA viral transition likely occurred around 4 billion years ago, bolstering the argument that information transfer from the RNA world to the emerging DNA world was facilitated by viruses prior to the emergence of the last universal common ancestor. From this research, it is evident that the genetic diversity and mechanisms of this ancient virus world are still present in modern viral ecosystems.

== Prebiotic synthesis on Earth ==
Alongside extraterrestrial delivery, organic molecules relevant to DNA may also have formed on early Earth through prebiotic chemistry. The Miller–Urey experiment demonstrated that amino acids could be synthesised abiotically from simple inorganic compounds under conditions simulating the early Earth's atmosphere and ocean. Subsequent work showed that purines, including adenine, could be produced from hydrogen cyanide (HCN) under similar prebiotic conditions.

== See also ==
- RNA world
- Abiogenesis
- Models of DNA evolution
- Panspermia
- Pseudo-panspermia
- Virus world hypothesis
- Double-stranded RNA
- DNA virus
