= Virus world hypothesis =

Theory that viruses predate cellular life

The discoverers of viroids (1) (Diener) and bacteriophages (2) (d'Hérelle) both surmised their own versions of a "virus-first hypothesis".

The virus world hypothesis (or the virus-first, the virus early, or the co-evolution hypothesis) proposes that self-replicating virus-like genetic elements existed before cellular life and contributed to its emergence. It is one of several scientific hypotheses that attempt to explain the origin and evolution of viruses.

All modern viruses are obligate parasites that cannot replicate independently of their cellular hosts; thus it may seem more intuitive to assume that viruses originated from cells, an idea known as the "escape hypothesis". However, within the framework of an hypothesized "virus world", modern viruses are held to be possible direct descendants of the very first replicons to arise on Earth, and to have emerged either simultaneously, or before, the evolution of cells. These primordial soup-dwelling replicons could have evolved into archaic virus-like structures, which in turn became the precursors of cellular life forms, with the latter possibly emerging as factories and reservoirs dedicated to virus production and dissemination.

The hypothesis is considered one of the three classical hypotheses of viral origins, although some researchers believe these may not be mutually exclusive: in a "chimeric scenario", it is held that different groups of viruses may have emerged through multiple routes, at different points in time.

== History ==
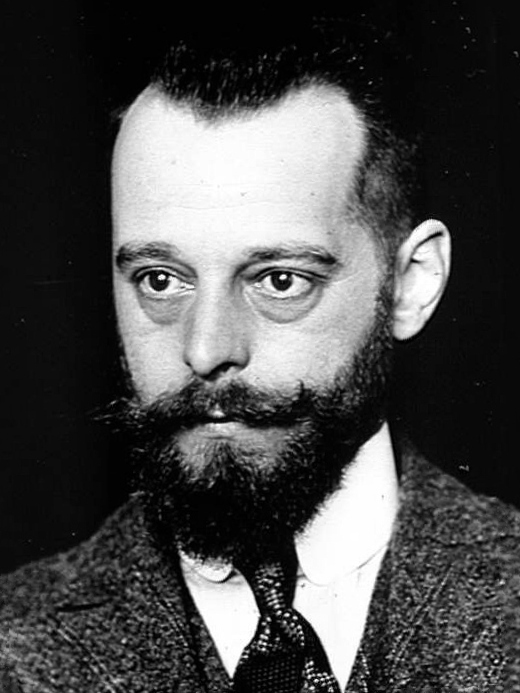
Félix d'Hérelle c.1905

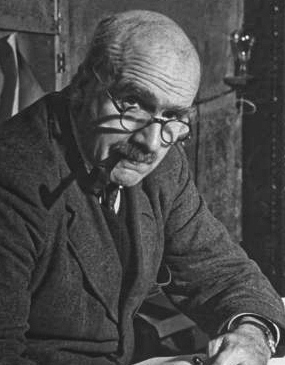
J. B. S. Haldane c.1940

The idea that viruses represent primordial, pre-cellular forms of life has roots in the earliest decades of virology. The French microbiologist Félix d'Hérelle, discoverer of bacteriophages, proposed that virus-like agents might be ancient replicators. The English evolutionary biologist J. B. S. Haldane developed the conjecture further in his 1929 essay "The Origin of Life", in which the bacteriophage served as his model for the first self-duplicating molecule, and led him to see viruses as a phylogenetic "missing link" between life and non-life.

The "virus world" view was largely displaced through the middle of the twentieth century and remained marginal for several decades. Advances in comparative genomics and structural biology have since revived interest in the origins of viruses; the Russian-American evolutionary biologist Eugene Koonin has described his "primordial virus world" scenario as recapitulating Haldane's ideas "at a new level".

== Overview ==
=== Model ===
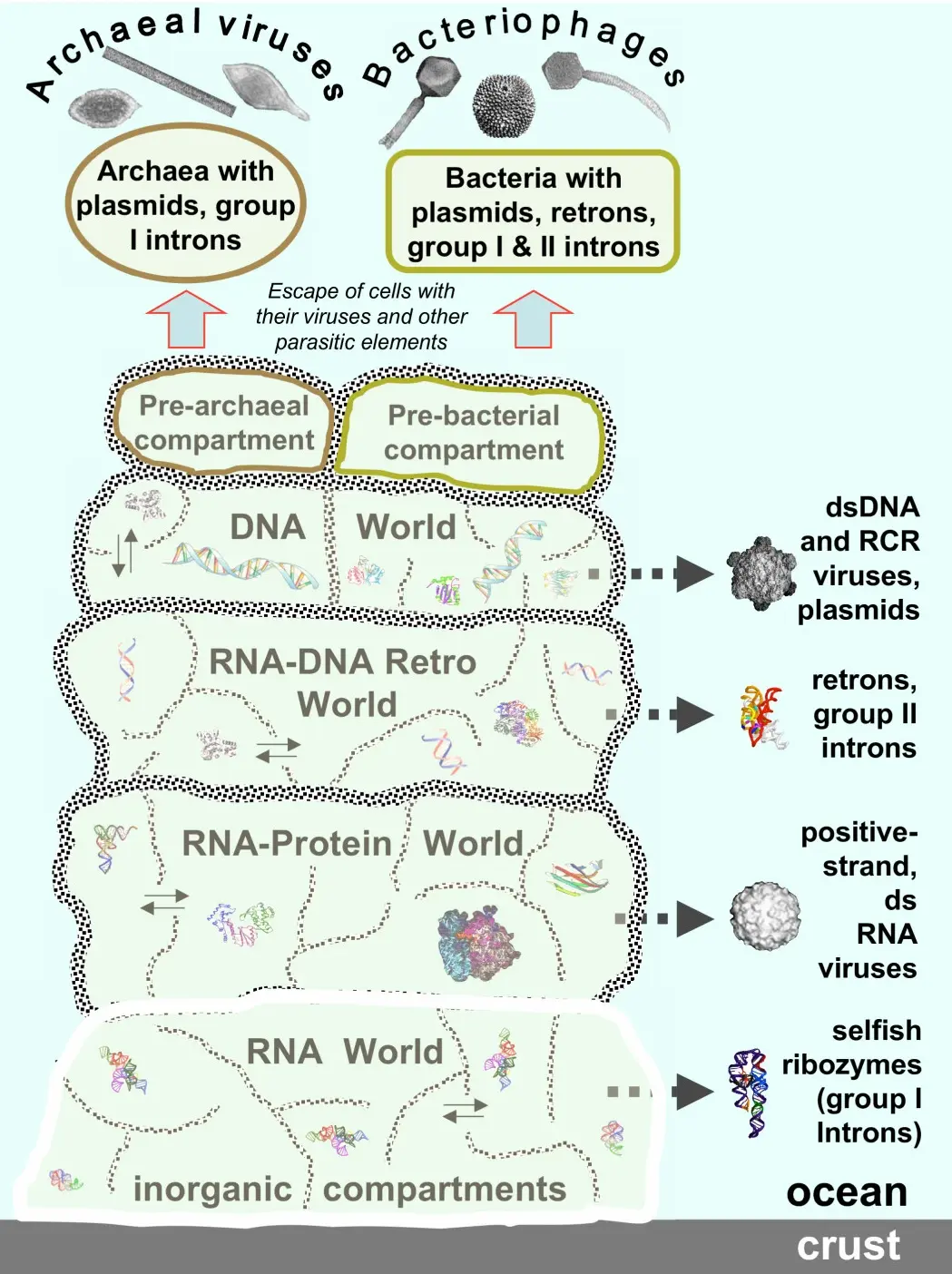
Hypothesized origin of the main lineages from the primordial gene pool

The virus-first model envisions the pre-cellular stage of life as a diverse pool of competing, virus-like replicators dwelling within networks of inorganic molecules (the so-called "primordial soup"), exchanging genetic material freely and lacking both full-fledged ribosomes and independent metabolism. RNA would have arisen first, followed by retroid elements and then DNA viruses, an order that links the hypothesis to the RNA world hypothesis, as contemporary viruses are argued to reflect evolution spanning from an early RNA world to the modern DNA/protein world. Viroids and ribozymes, as the simplest known self-replicating RNA elements, could be considered the closest extant analogues of these early replicators.

Within this framework, Patrick Forterre proposed that the transition from an RNA world to the modern DNA-based cellular world was itself driven by viruses: three independent DNA viruses may have each displaced the ancestral RNA genome in three separate primordial cell lineages, giving rise to the Bacteria, Archaea, and Eukarya. This accounts for the observed lack of homology between the core DNA polymerases used by the three domains. Forterre introduced the virocell concept to formalise the distinction between the metabolically inert extracellular virion and the metabolically active infected cell, arguing that the latter constitutes the true living form of the virus. Gill and Forterre extended the model by proposing that ancestral extracellular vesicles may have been evolutionary intermediates between simple lipid compartments and the first virions, with early ribovirocells (cells simultaneously capable of dividing and producing virions) representing a transitional stage before the existence of the last universal common ancestor (LUCA). Koonin further proposed that viral capsids may have functioned as a primitive compartment that helped pioneer the plasma membrane architectures eventually adopted by cells.

=== Phylogenetics ===
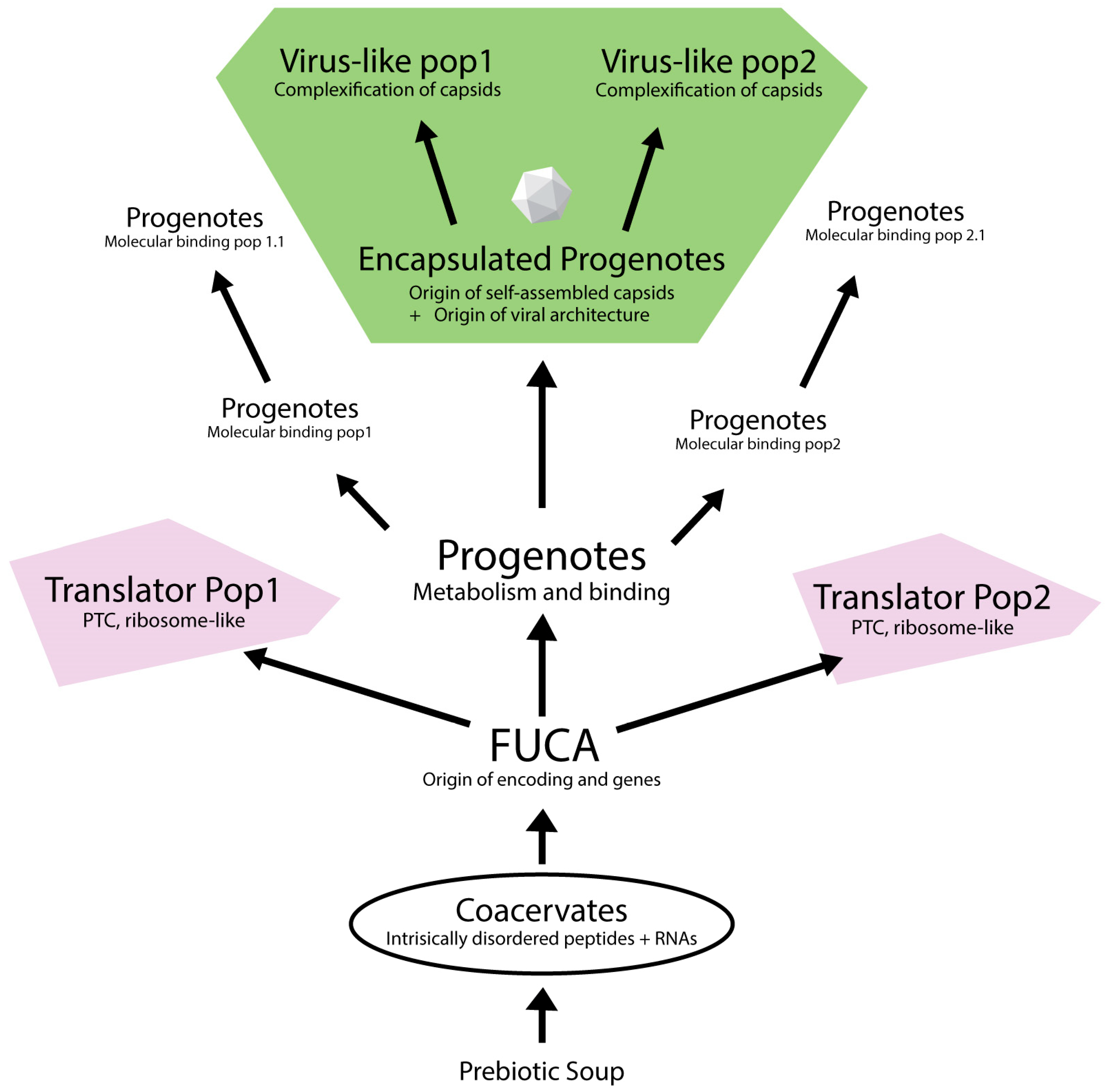
Evolutionary emergence of virus-like particles from RNP-based progenotes, a model linking the RNP world and virus-first theories

The "virus hallmark genes" are a distinct set of conserved genes shared across a wide range of virus groups and notably absent from cellular life. Some of the smallest virus genomes (such as parvoviruses or the single-stranded RNA tombusviruses) consist mostly of these hallmark genes, whereas in the largest viruses these genes comprise a minority. Since the hallmark genes possess only distant homologs in cellular life (which nonetheless appear also to be of viral origin), while also forming a network that connects almost all viruses, their existence therefore seems to suggest descent from a primordial genetic pool predating LUCA, thus constituting an uninterrupted gene flow from the pre-cellular stage, although Koonin suggests that double-stranded RNA and negative-strand RNA viruses are still likely to have independently evolved later.

The conventional assumption that when viral and host genes cluster phylogenetically, the parasitic virus must therefore have derived its genes from the host, has been particularly disputed. Metagenomic surveys of marine environments have shown that the majority of photosynthesis genes detected are of viral origin, display a virus-like codon usage bias, and undergo selection independently of their hosts, suggesting they evolved within the virosphere rather than being captured from cells. Furthermore, viruses collectively constitute the largest reservoir of genetic diversity in the known biosphere, a fact which, with the addition of the hallmark genes having no clear cellular homologs, is argued by Luis P. Villarreal to be difficult to reconcile with a model in which the virosphere is derived from cellular life.

=== Viroid-first ===
Unlike the main virus-first scenario, the "viroid-first" or "viroid early" version holds that viroids are not only direct descendants of pre-cellular replicators but also holdovers from the pre-protein RNA world, as evidenced by their use of ribozymes for a stage of replication. Theodor Otto Diener, the discoverer of viroids, proposed in 1989 that their small size, circular structure, ribozyme activity, and complete lack of protein-coding capacity make them more plausible relics of the RNA world than any other known entity, and described them as "living fossils" of pre-cellular evolution. However, a 2022 paper argued that since viroid-like agents have been found only in multicellular eukaryotes, with no representatives in bacteria or archaea, their origin likely postdates rather than predates cellular life, and their secondary structures are attuned to protein-based polymerases rather than the ribozyme polymerases of a pre-cellular setting. They proposed instead that viroids most plausibly arose by "escape" from retrozymes. The discovery of new viroid-like cccRNAs through metatranscriptome mining later caused the authors to reconsider Diener's theory.

=== Chimeric scenario ===
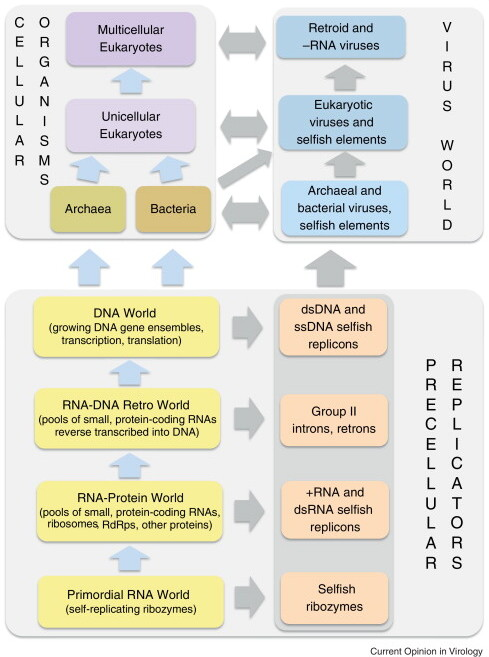
A model for the evolution of life forms from a primordial virus world in a chimeric scenario

More recent work has treated the classical hypotheses as complementary. A 2019 Nature article proposed a chimeric scenario in which viral replication modules descended from primordial pre-cellular replicators, consistent with the virus-first view, while genes encoding major capsid proteins were independently recruited from cellular hosts at multiple points during the diversification of the virosphere, consistent with the escape hypothesis.

In the main proposed chimeric scenario, the replication and morphogenetic modules of viruses are argued to have two different evolutionary origins:

- Replication modules may descend directly from the primordial genetic pool; no evidence exists that proteins such as RNA-dependent RNA polymerase, reverse transcriptase, or rolling-circle replication endonuclease were ever encoded by pure cellular genes, thus pointing to an early origin for viral replication, although the long course of their subsequent evolution did involve displacements by replicative genes from their cellular hosts.
- Morphogenetic modules by contrast had to have come later, as the most common capsid fold (single jelly-roll), exists in bacteria, archaea, and eukaryotes as TNF superfamily members. The cellular versions of these folds are far more widespread and varied than their viral counterparts, meaning capsid proteins were likely cellular at first.

New viral lineages could then continue to emerge from cellular sources throughout evolutionary history, while also possessing primordial replication genes, explaining the polyphyletic character of the modern viruses.

== Alternatives ==
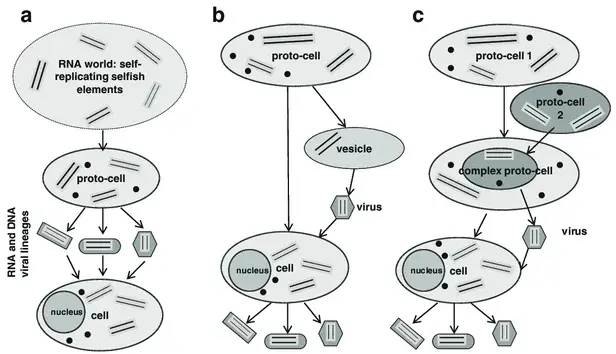
Three classical hypotheses of viral origin

The main issue with the primodial virus world is that all known viruses require a host cell for replication, making a pre-cellular virus inconsistent with the standard definition of a virus as an obligate intracellular parasite. Therefore, the hypothesis has been challenged and the existence of an ancient and independent viral world critiqued. Biologists López-García and David Moreira of Paris-Saclay University, known for the Syntrophy hypothesis, have written against the idea of viruses being older than LUCA, or part of the tree of life at all, and claimed that current scientific evidence should downright dismiss the idea. The pair has contended that virus hallmark genes could derive from ancient cellular lineages now extinct, and that viruses lack the structural historical continuity required for inclusion on a tree of life alongside cells. They have also pointed out that not a single hallmark gene is shared across all extant viruses, although this observation does not take the "chimeric scenario" into account. Supporters Koonin, Senkevich, and Dolja responded that large viral gene sets evolve congruently over hundreds of millions of years, and that the abundance of viral genes lacking any cellular homolog argues against a purely cellular derivation.

=== Giant viruses ===
Study of giant viruses has provided mixed evidence for the positioning of viruses in the tree of life. A study analyzing mimiviruses found that the majority of its core replication proteins group phylogenetically with eukaryotic cellular homologs, and that the replication genes show no evidence of recent horizontal gene transfer and are under purifying selection. The authors argued that because the eukaryotic resemblance cannot be explained by recent gene acquisition from a host, it reflects genuine shared ancestry, and concluded that mimiviruses most plausibly descended from a complex cellular ancestor by reductive evolution, contradicting the idea that it represents a relic of a pre-cellular viral lineage. Because viruses leave no fossil record, their evolutionary trajectories must be inferred entirely from extant molecular data, and no analysis to date has definitively resolved the question of viral origins.

=== Symbiogenic model ===
In a more complex iteration of the classical regressive hypothesis, the co-evolutionary "symbiogenic" model proposed in 2012 hypothesizes that ancient cells coexisted with ancient virocells and that modern-day viruses evolved by genomic reduction. Their phylogenomic timeline places a communal cellular world first. Viruses would then emerge from a primordial cellular stem line by losing genes and complexity over time, with a key point being that the regression occurred before the advent of parasitism, and that the obligate parasitism of these cell-derived viruses developed much later.

== See also ==
- RNP world
- Virus-like particle
- Bacteriophage
- Origin of DNA
- FUCA
