= Darwinian threshold =

Period during the evolution of the first cells

Darwinian threshold or Darwinian transition is a term introduced by Carl Woese to describe a transition period during the evolution of the first cells when genetic transmission moves from a predominantly horizontal mode to a vertical mode. The process starts when the ancestors of the Last Universal Common Ancestor (the LUCA) are no longer primarily dependent on horizontal (or lateral) gene transfer (HGT) and become individual entities with vertical heredity upon which natural selection is effective. After this transition, life is characterized by genealogies that have a modern tree-like phylogeny.

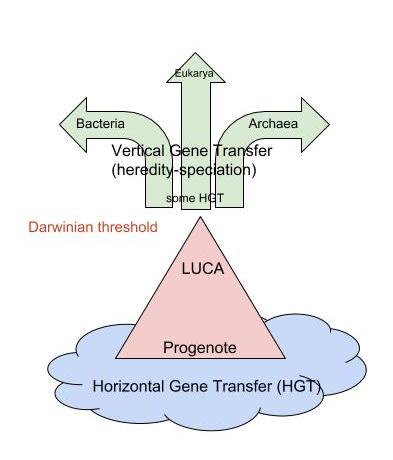
Darwinian threshold: the transition period during the evolution of the first cells when genetic transmission moves from a predominantly horizontal mode to a vertical mode

== Before the Darwinian threshold ==
The Last Universal Common Ancestor is often considered to be an already complex organism with a DNA-based genome, a complex informational flow and an efficient metabolism, but some authors, like Carl Woese, believe instead that the LUCA was not a discrete entity but rather a diverse community of cells that survived and evolved as a biological unit.

Carl Woese indicated that most likely there existed high mutation rates and small genomes. Also present were small proteins and larger imprecisely translated "statistical proteins". Entities in which translation had not yet developed to the point that proteins of the modern type could arise, have been termed "progenotes," and the era during which these were the most advanced forms of life, the "progenote era".

These organisms or biological entities, these progenotes (or ribocytes), had RNA as informational molecule instead of DNA. RNA is capable of both catalysis and replication and could have been central to the origins of heredity and life itself. It has been proposed that the initial molecular events were carried out by transfer RNAs (tRNAs). It is hypothesized that structured tRNAs could have provided amino acids during a process called self-translation of a single extended tRNA strand.

It is hypothesized compartmentalization with membranes was not yet completed and translation of proteins was not precise. Likely not every progenote had its own metabolism; different metabolic steps may've been present in different progenotes. Therefore, it is thought that there existed a community of sub-systems that started to cooperate collectively and culminated in the LUCA.

== After the Darwinian threshold ==
Most scientists place the LUCA at the root of the tree of life. From this root depart two Prokaryotic Domains: the Bacteria and the Archaea. Just after this first split, one of the branches, going towards the Archaea, splits again and gives rise to a third branch which is that of the Eukaryotes so that now there are three Domains of life. Carl Woese thought that even during the era around the origin of the LUCA, the root and the first branches were very blurred since the cells were not very well defined yet and HGT was still quite important. Some authors maintain LUCA was a mesophilic eukaryote. According to these authors the Domains that derived from LUCA through a process of reductive evolution or "streamlining" were Prokaryotes; mesophilic and thermophilic Bacteria and thermophilic Archaea. The term "prokaryote" should therefore be abandoned, since it suggests that "prokaryotes" preceded "eukaryotes" in their evolution from LUCA towards complexity.

== See also ==
- Horizontal gene transfer
- Horizontal gene transfer in evolution
- Evolution
- Carl Woese
- Last universal common ancestor
