= Primordial sandwich =

The concept of the primordial sandwich was proposed by the chemist Günter Wächtershäuser to describe the possible origins of the first cell membranes, and, therefore, the first cell.

According to the two main models of abiogenesis, RNA world and iron-sulfur world, prebiotic processes existed before the development of the cell membrane. The difficulty with this idea, however, is that it is almost impossible to create a complex molecule such as RNA (or even its molecular precursor, pre-RNA) directly from simple organic molecules dissolved in a global ocean (Joyce, 1991), because without some mechanism to concentrate these organic molecules, they would be too dilute to generate the necessary chemical reactions to transform them from simple organic molecules into genuine prebiotic molecules.

To address this problem, Wächtershäuser proposed that concentration might occur by concentration upon ("adsorption to") the surfaces of minerals. With the accumulation of enough amphipathic molecules (such as phospholipids), a bilayer will self-organize, and any molecules caught inside will become the contents of a liposome, and would be concentrated enough to allow chemical reactions to transform organic molecules into prebiotic molecules.

Although developed for his own iron-sulfur world model, the idea of the primordial sandwich has also been adopted by some adherents of the RNA world model.

== See also ==
- Primordial sea
- Primordial soup
