= RNA-based evolution =

Theory that RNA plays an independent role in determining phenotype

RNA-based evolution is a theory that posits that RNA is not merely an intermediate between the Watson and Crick model of the DNA molecule and proteins, but rather a far more dynamic and independent role-player in determining phenotype. By regulating the transcription in DNA sequences, the stability of RNA, and the capability of messenger RNA to be translated, RNA processing events allow for a diverse array of proteins to be synthesized from a single gene. Since RNA processing is heritable, it is subject to natural selection suggested by Darwin and contributes to the evolution and diversity of most eukaryotic organisms.

== Role of RNA in conventional evolution ==
In accordance with the central dogma of molecular biology, RNA passes information between the DNA of a genome and the proteins expressed within an organism. Therefore, from an evolutionary standpoint, a mutation within the DNA bases results in an alteration of the RNA transcripts, which in turn leads to a direct difference in phenotype. RNA is also believed to have been the genetic material of the first life on Earth. The role of RNA in the origin of life is best supported by the ease of forming RNA from basic chemical building blocks (such as amino acids, sugars, and hydroxyl acids) that were likely present 4 billion years ago. Molecules of RNA have also been shown to effectively self-replicate, catalyze basic reactions, and store heritable information. As life progressed and evolved over time only DNA, which is much more chemically stable than RNA, could support large genomes and eventually took over the role as the major carrier of genetic information.

== Single-Stranded RNA can fold into complex structures ==
Single-stranded RNA molecules can single handedly fold into complex structures. The molecules fold into secondary and tertiary structures by intramolecular base pairing. There is a fine dynamic of disorder and order that facilitate an efficient structure formation. RNA strands form complementary base pairs. These complementary strands of RNA base pair with another strand, which results in a three-dimensional shape from the paired strands folding in on itself. The formation of the secondary structure results from base pairing by hydrogen bonds between the strands, while tertiary structure results from folding of the RNA. The three-dimensional structure consists of grooves and helices. The formation of these complex structure gives reason to suspect that early life could have formed by RNA.

== Variability of RNA processing ==
Research within the past decade has shown that strands of RNA are not merely transcribed from regions of DNA and translated into proteins. Rather RNA has retained some of its former independence from DNA and is subject to a network of processing events that alter the protein expression from that bounded by just the genomic DNA. Processing of RNA influences protein expression by managing the transcription of DNA sequences, the stability of RNA, and the translation of messenger RNA.

=== Alternative splicing ===
Splicing is the process by which non-coding regions of RNA are removed. The number and combination of splicing events varies greatly based on differences in transcript sequence and environmental factors. Variation in phenotype caused by alternative splicing is best seen in the sex determination of D. melanogaster. The Tra gene, determinant of sex, in male flies becomes truncated as splicing events fail to remove a stop codon that controls the length of the RNA molecule. In others the stop signal is retained within the final RNA molecule and a functional Tra protein is produced resulting in the female phenotype. Thus, alternative RNA splicing events allow differential phenotypes, regardless of the identity of the coding DNA sequence.

=== RNA stability ===
Phenotype may also be determined by the number of RNA molecules, as more RNA transcripts lead to a greater expression of protein. Short tails of repetitive nucleic acids are often added to the ends of RNA molecules in order to prevent degradation, effectively increasing the number of RNA strands able to be translated into protein. During mammalian liver regeneration RNA molecules of growth factors increase in number due to the addition of signaling tails. With more transcripts present the growth factors are produced at a higher rate, aiding the rebuilding process of the organ.

=== RNA silencing ===
Silencing of RNA occurs when double stranded RNA molecules are processed by a series of enzymatic reactions, resulting in RNA fragments that degrade complementary RNA sequences. By degrading transcripts, a lower amount of protein products are translated and the phenotype is altered by yet another RNA processing event.

== RNA and Protein ==
In Earth's early developmental history RNA was the primary substance of life. RNA served as a blueprint for genetic material and was the catalyst to multiply said blueprint. Currently RNA acts by forming proteins. protein enzymes carry out catalytic reactions. RNAs are critical in gene expression and that gene expression depends on mRNA, rRNA, and tRNA. There is a relationship between protein and RNAs. This relationship could suggest that there is a mutual transfer of energy or information. In vitro RNA selection experiments have produced RNA that bind tightly to amino acids. It has been shown that the amino acids recognized by the RNA nucleotide sequences had a disproportionately high frequency of codons for said amino acids. There is a possibility that the direct association of amino acids containing specific RNA sequences yielded a limited genetic code.

== Evolutionary mechanism ==
Most RNA processing events work in concert with one another and produce networks of regulating processes that allow a greater variety of proteins to be expressed than those strictly directed by the genome. These RNA processing events can also be passed on from generation to generation via reverse transcription into the genome. Over time, RNA networks that produce the fittest phenotypes will be more likely to be maintained in a population, contributing to evolution. Studies have shown that RNA processing events have especially been critical with the fast phenotypic evolution of vertebrates—large jumps in phenotype explained by changes in RNA processing events. Human genome searches have also revealed RNA processing events that have provided significant “sequence space for more variability”. On the whole, RNA processing expands the possible phenotypes of a given genotype and contributes to the evolution and diversity of life.

== RNA virus evolution ==
RNA virus evolution appears to be facilitated by a high mutation rate caused by the lack of a proofreading mechanism during viral genome replication. In addition to mutation, RNA virus evolution is also facilitated by genetic recombination. Genetic recombination can occur when at least two RNA viral genomes are present in the same host cell and has been studies in numerous RNA viruses. RNA recombination appears to be a major driving force in viral evolution among Picornaviridae ((+)ssRNA) (e.g. poliovirus). In the Retroviridae ((+)ssRNA)(e.g. HIV), damage in the RNA genome appears to be avoided during reverse transcription by strand switching, a form of genetic recombination. Recombination also occurs in the Coronaviridae ((+)ssRNA) (e.g. SARS). Recombination in RNA viruses appears to be an adaptation for coping with genome damage. Recombination can occur infrequently between animal viruses of the same species but of divergent lineages. The resulting recombinant viruses may sometimes cause an outbreak of infection in humans.

== See also ==
- RNA world
