= Thermosynthesis =

Thermosynthesis is a theoretical mechanism proposed by Anthonie Muller for biological use of the free energy in a temperature gradient to drive energetically uphill anabolic reactions. It makes use of this thermal gradient, or the dissipative structure of convection in this gradient, to drive a microscopic heat engine that performs condensation reactions. Thus negative entropy is generated. The components of the biological thermosynthesis machinery concern progenitors of today's ATP synthase, which functions according to the binding change mechanism, driven by chemiosmosis. Resembling primitive free energy generating physico-chemical processes based on temperature-dependent adsorption to inorganic materials such as clay, this simple type of energy conversion is proposed to have sustained the origin of life, including the emergence of the RNA World. For this RNA World it gives a model that describes the stepwise acquisition of the set of transfer RNAs that sustains the genetic code. The phylogenetic tree of extant transfer RNAs is consistent with the idea.

Thermosynthesis may still occur in some terrestrial and extraterrestrial environments. However, no organisms are known at present that use thermosynthesis as a source of energy, although it is possible that it might occur in extraterrestrial environments where no light is available, such as on the subsurface ocean that may exist on the moon Europa. Thermosynthesis also permits a simple model for the origin of photosynthesis. It has moreover been used to explain the origin of animals by symbiogenesis of benthic sessile thermosynthesizers at hydrothermal vents during the Snowball Earths of the Precambrian. Preliminary experiments have started to attempt to isolate thermosynthetic organisms.

== Muller's Biothermosynthesis ==
A Dutch biochemist and physicist Anthonie Muller wrote many papers on thermosynthesis since 1983. He defined thermosynthesis as: "Biological heat engines working on thermal cycling." also as: "Theoretical biological mechanism for free energy gain from thermal cycling, tentatively stated as the energy source for origin of life."

The thermosynthesis concept, biological free energy gain from thermal cycling, is combined with the concept of the RNA World. The resulting overall origin of life model suggests new explanations for the emergence of the genetic code and the ribosome. It is proposed that the first protein named pF(1) obtained the energy to support the RNA World by a thermal variation of F(1) ATP synthase's binding change mechanism. It is further proposed that this pF(1) was the single translation product during the emergence of the genetic machinery. During thermal cycling pF(1) condensed many substrates with broad specificity, yielding NTPs and randomly constituted protein and RNA libraries that contained self-replicating RNA. The smallness of pF(1) permitted the emergence of the genetic machinery by selection of RNA that increased the fraction of pF(1)s in the protein library: (1) an amino acids concatenating progenitor of rRNA bound to (2) a chain of 'positional tRNAs' linked by mutual recognition, and yielded a pF(1) (or its main motif); this positional tRNA set gradually evolved to a set of regular tRNAs functioning according to the genetic code, with concomitant emergence of (3) an mRNA coding for pF(1).

== See also ==
- Metabolism
- Oxidative phosphorylation
