= First universal common ancestor =

Possible earliest ancestor of the LUCA ancestral cell

The first universal common ancestor (FUCA) is proposed to have been a non-cellular entity that was the earliest organism with a genetic code capable of performing biological translation of RNA molecules to protein formation through peptide synthesis. Its descendants would include the last universal common ancestor (LUCA) and, therefore, all modern cells. FUCA would also be the ancestor of ancient sister lineages of LUCA with no direct modern descendants, but which may have transferred genetic material horizontally into the genomes of early descendants of LUCA.

FUCA is thought to have been composed of progenotes, ancient biological systems that would have used RNA for their genome and self-replication. By comparison, LUCA would have had a complex metabolism and a DNA genome containing hundreds of genes grouped into several gene families.

== Origins ==
Long before compartmentalized biology like FUCA appeared, life is hypothesized to have emerged through the organization of a pre-cellular era in the RNA world. In this era, self-replicating RNA molecules would have both stored genetic information and catalyzed chemical reactions. Translation machinery and the genetic code is universally present in all known cells and viruses, indicating a single origin for biological systems (monophyly).

FUCA is thought to have been the first organism capable of biological translation, using RNA molecules to convert information into peptides and produce proteins. This first translation system is thought to have formed at the same time as an error-prone early genetic code. FUCA would be the first biological system to have a genetic code that dictates specific protein assembly.

The development of FUCA would have been a gradual process initially without the genetic code. FUCA is hypothesized to have arisen from the ribosome, a complex made of RNA and proteins that evolved from a more primitive ribonucleoprotein machinery. FUCA appeared when the early peptidyl transferase center first emerged and when RNA world replicators could bond amino acids into short chained oligopeptides.

The first genes of FUCA most likely encoded ribosomal components, primitive tRNA-aminoacyl transferases, and other proteins that helped stabilize and maintain biological translation. These random peptides may have bound back to the single strand nucleic acid polymers which increased their stability and the robustness of the system, binding other stabilizing molecules. When FUCA matured, its genetic code was then completely established.

It has been proposed that FUCA was composed by a population of open-systems, exchanging components and information with the environment, and a population of self-replicating ribonucleoproteins. The progenote era began when these interaction systems arrived. These systems reached maturity when self-organization processes resulted in the emergence of a genetic code. This genetic code was, for the first time, able to organize an ordered interaction between nucleic acids and proteins through the formation of a biological language. This caused pre-cellular open systems to start to accumulate information and self-organizing, producing the first genomes by the assembling biochemical pathways. The pathways probably appeared in different progenote populations that independently evolved.

== Progenotes ==
Progenotes (also called ribocytes or ribocells) are open or semi-open biological systems capable of intensely exchanging genetic information, before the existence of cells and LUCA. The term progenote was coined by Carl Woese in 1977, around the time he introduced the concept of the three domains of life (bacteria, archaea, and eukaryotes). Woese also proposed that each domain originated from a different progenote. The meaning of progenote changed over time, when in the 1980s, Doolittle and Darnell used the term to refer to the single ancestor of all three domains of life, now referred to as the last universal common ancestor (LUCA).

The terms ribocyte and ribocell refer to progenotes as early forms of ribosomes (protoribosomes), hypothetical primitive cellular organisms with self-replicating RNA with an RNA genome instead of the usual DNA genome. In Carl Woese's Darwinian threshold period of cellular evolution, progenotes are also thought to have had RNA rather than DNA as informational molecule.

The evolution of the ribosome from ancient ribocytes, the self-replicating RNA systems and machinery, into its current form as a translation machine may have been the selective pressure to then incorporate proteins into the ribosome's self-replicating mechanisms, which would increase its capacity to self-replicate. Ribosomal RNA is thought to have emerged before cells or viruses, during the time when progenotes existed.

Progenotes both composed FUCA and descended from FUCA. FUCA is thought to have organized the transition from initial biological systems to mature progenotes. Progenotes were the dominant forms during the Progenote age, when biological systems first originated and assembled. The Progenote age would have happened after the pre-biotic RNA-world and Peptide-world ages, but before the emergence and presence of organisms and mature biological systems like viruses, bacteria and archaea.

The most successful progenotes populations were probably the ones capable of binding and processing carbohydrates, amino acids, and other intermediated metabolites and co-factors. In progenotes, there was not complete compartmentalization by membranes and translation of proteins was not precise. Not every progenote had a full metabolism on its own; different metabolic steps occurred in different progenotes. Therefore, it is assumed that there was a community of interacting sub-systems that began to cooperate collectively and eventually culminated in the LUCA.

=== Ribocytes and viruses ===
In the eocyte hypothesis linking the closest known archaeal relatives of eukaryotes (achaean eocytes), the organism at the root of the eocytes lineage may have been a ribocyte from the RNA-world. For cellular DNA and DNA processing systems, an "out of virus" scenario has been proposed. In this model, DNA as the main genetic information material may have first evolved in viruses and was later transferred to ribocytes twice: once transforming them into bacteria and once transforming them into archaea.

Similarly in viral eukaryogenesis, a hypothesis theorizing that eukaryotes evolved from a DNA virus, ribocytes may have been an ancient host for a DNA virus. Because ribocytes used RNA to store their genetic information, viruses may initially have used DNA as a way to resist RNA-degrading enzymes present in the host ribocells. The introduction of a DNA-based system may have been as significant for protocells as later additions of chloroplasts or mitochondria through endosymbiosis in evolving eukaryotic cells. In this hypothesis, bacteria, archaea, and eukaryotes each obtained their DNA informational system from a different virus.

In the reduction hypothesis, where giant viruses evolved from primordial cells that became parasitic, viruses might have evolved after FUCA but before LUCA.

== See also ==
- Abiogenesis
- Alternative abiogenesis scenarios
- Earliest known life forms
- RNP world
- Protocell
- Pre-cell
- Proto-metabolism, that FUCA may or may not have had
- Horizontal gene transfer in evolution
