= RNP world =

Hypothetical stage of early life

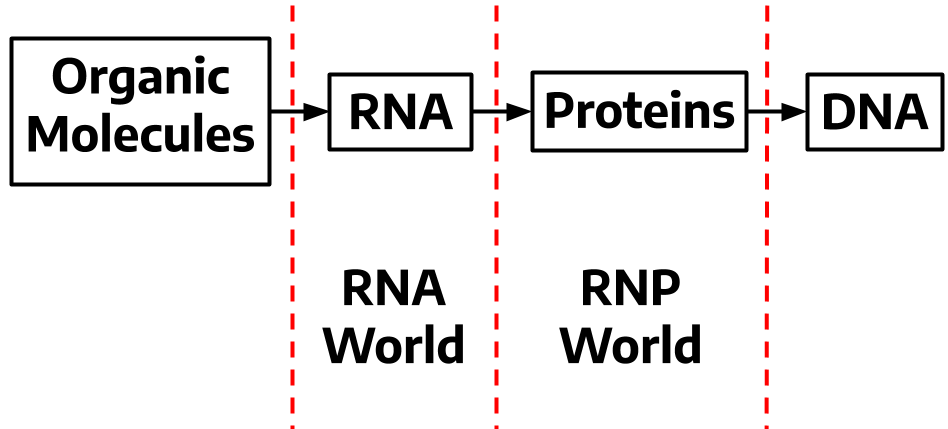
The hypothesized transition from RNA to proteins to DNA

The RNP world is a hypothesized intermediate period in the origin of life characterized by the primary metabolic role of ribonucleoproteins. The period followed the hypothesized RNA world and ended with the formation of DNA and contemporary proteins. In the RNP world, RNA molecules began to synthesize peptides. These would eventually become proteins which have since assumed most of the diverse functions RNA performed previously. This transition paved the way for DNA to replace RNA as the primary store of genetic information, leading to life as we know it.

== Principle of concept ==
Thomas Cech, in 2009, proposed the existence of the RNP world after his observation of apparent differences in the composition of catalysts in the two most fundamental processes that maintain and express genetic systems. For DNA, the maintenance, replication, and transcription processes are accomplished purely by protein polymerases, not by self-catalysis. However, the mRNA processes of gene expression via splicing and protein synthesis are catalyzed by RNP complexes (the spliceosome and ribosome).

This difference between protein and ribonucleoprotein catalysts can be explained by extending the RNA world theory. The older RNA molecules were originally self-catalyzed through ribozymes, with a single type of molecule serving both as information templates and metabolic catalysts. RNA then evolved the assistance of proteins to form RNP. Thereafter, the newer DNA molecule used only the more efficient protein processes from the start. Thus, our current DNA world could have resulted from the gradual replacement of RNA catalysis machines with proteins. In this view, ribonucleoproteins and nucleotide-based cofactors are remnants of an intermediary era, the RNP world.

== See also ==
- First universal common ancestor
- Virus world hypothesis
