= Patrick Forterre =

French writer and researcher in biology

Patrick Forterre (French pronunciation: [patʁik fɔʁtɛʁ], born 21 August 1949) is a French biologist and writer. He had served as professor at Paris-Sud University and Pasteur Institute. He is known for his work on Archaea, viruses and the evolution of life. He was the first to use the acronym "LUCA" for the last universal common ancestor in a 1997 paper.

== Biography ==
Forterre was born in Paris. He studied biochemistry at the Paris VII University (Paris Diderot University later incorporated to Paris Cité University), Jussieu campus. He joined the faculty of Paris VII University from 1973 as research assistant (equivalent to assistant professor) teaching cell and molecular biology. In 1986, he was promoted to associate professor. In 1989, he was appointed full professor at University XI (Paris-Sud University). In 1988, he became head of a research team at the Institute of Genetics and Microbiology (IGM) in Orsay and directed research on Archaea, the new group of organisms discovered in 1977 by Carl Woese. In 2003, he joined the Pasteur Institute as Director of Microbiology Department, and designated professor in 2014. He was then conferred honorary professorship at Paris-Sud University.

Patrick Forterre is particularly known for his theories on evolution, contributions to the virus world hypothesis, and his stances on the recognition of viruses as living beings in their own right.

He worked as a scientist in the documentary film Species of Species, produced in 2008.

Forterre was elected member of the European Academy of Microbiology in 2015 and the Academia Europaea in 2017.

== Scientific articles ==
- Patrick Forterre, Simonetta Gribaldo & Céline Brochier : (Luca: in search of the nearest universal common ancestor) (Luca : à la recherche du plus proche ancêtre commun universel), Médecine / Sciences, vol. 21, n°10, 2005, pp. 860–865
- Simonetta Gribaldo, Patrick Forterre et Céline Brochier-Armanet : The Archaea: evolution and diversity of the third domain of life (Les Archaea : évolution et diversité du troisième domaine du vivant, Bull. Soc. Fr. Microbiol., vol. 23, n°3, 2008, pp. 137–145
- Patrick Forterre, Viruses back on the scene (Les virus à nouveau sur le devant de la scène), Biologie Aujourd’hui, vol.207, n°3, Société de biologie, 13 décembre 2013, pp. 153–168 doi:10.1051/jbio/2013018
- Patrick Forterre, The Viral Cell Cog of Life, (La cellule virale rouage de la vie), Pour la Science, n°469, special issue: Le nouveau monde des microbes, Novembre 2016, pp. 42–49 text=résumé
