= Luis P. Villarreal =

American virologist

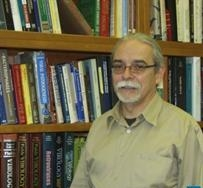
- Born: East Los Angeles California
- Education: California State University, Los Angeles (BS); University of California, San Diego (PhD)
- Known for: Virus-first theory of evolution
- Scientific career
- Fields: Virology, Molecular biology, Evolutionary biology
- Workplaces: University of California, Irvine
- Doctoral advisor: John Holland

Luis P. Villarreal is an American virologist and professor of molecular biology and biochemistry at the University of California, Irvine (UCI). He is the founding director of the Center for Virus Research at UCI and is known for advocating a "virus-first" perspective on the origins of life and the role of endogenous retroviruses in evolution.

== Early life ==
Villarreal is a native of East Los Angeles. After graduating high school, he enrolled at a community college intending to become a medical technician, later transferring to California State University, Los Angeles, where he earned a Bachelor of Science in biochemistry. He has cited the decision to switch to biochemistry as the most important of his academic life.

Villarreal received his PhD in biology from the University of California, San Diego. He subsequently completed a postdoctoral fellowship at Stanford University under Nobel laureate Paul Berg.

== Work ==
Following his postdoctoral work, Villarreal taught at the University of Colorado School of Medicine for seven years before joining UCI in 1985 as a professor of molecular biology. He later became the founding director of the Center for Virus Research at UCI. He is a recipient of the National Science Foundation Presidential Award for Excellence in Science, Mathematics and Engineering Mentoring

Villarreal's research centers on the evolutionary role of viruses, particularly endogenous retroviruses (ERVs) and their integration into host genomes. He posits that viral genetic material comprising roughly 10% of the human genome has played a functional role in evolution, including in the development of the placenta. In experiments with mice, he and colleagues demonstrated that suppressing endogenous retroviruses expressed specifically in placental tissue prevented embryo implantation, suggesting these viral sequences help mammals carry embryos without triggering an immune rejection.

Villarreal is an advocates for a "virus first" hypothesis for the origin of life, proposing that a viral collective gave rise to cellular life, and that viruses then continued to play a major role throughout evolutionary history. He refutes the idea that Junk DNA is without function, and believes that in the course of evolution viral DNA has endowed hosts with unique new capacities

== Selected publications ==
- Viruses and the Evolution of Life (ASM Press, 2005)
- Origin of Group Identity: Viruses, Addiction and Cooperation

== See also ==
- Endogenous retrovirus
- Viral evolution
- Origin of life
