= C3H4N2S =

The molecular formula C_{3}H_{4}N_{2}S (molar mass: 100.14 g/mol) may refer to:

- 2-Aminothiazole
- 2-Imidazolidinethione
- Thiadiazine
