= C3H4N2O =

The molecular formula C_{3}H_{4}N_{2}O may refer to:

- 2-Aminooxazole
- Cyanoacetamide
- 1,3-Dihydroimidazol-2-one
