= Encef =

Encef may refer to:

- Encef, a trade name in India for cefixime
- Encef, a trade name in India for ceftriaxone
- Encef, a trade name in Turkey for cefdinir

== See also ==
- Ancef, a trade name for cefazolin
