= 2-nitroimidazole nitrohydrolase =

Class of enzymes

Identifiers
- EC no.: 3.5.99.9

Databases
- BRENDA: enzyme data
- ExPASy: NiceZyme view
- KEGG: enzyme entry
- MetaCyc: metabolic pathway
- Rhea: reactions
- PDB structures: RCSB PDB PDBe PDBsum
Search
- PMC: articles
- PubMed: articles
- NCBI: proteins

2-nitroimidazole nitrohydrolase (EC 3.5.99.9, NnhA, 2NI nitrohydrolase, 2NI denitrase) is an enzyme with systematic name 2-nitroimidazole nitrohydrolase. It catalyses the hydrolysis of 2-nitroimidazole (azomycin) to imidazol-2-one and nitrous acid.

azomycin
H_{2}O
HO−N=O
imidazol-2-one

The enzyme is present in the soil bacterium Mycobacterium species JS330. Azomycin is a naturally-occurring antibiotic and antimicrobial used to treat tuberculosis. Its action requires that it be converted by a nitroreductase to a radical anion and this enzyme confers resistance to azomycin by converting it to a non-toxic derivative.
