= C6H10N2O4 =

The molecular formula C_{6}H_{10}N_{2}O_{4} (molar mass: 174.15 g/mol) may refer to:

- Diethyl azodicarboxylate
- Formiminoglutamic acid
- Ribose aminooxazoline
