= John Sutherland (chemist) =

British chemist

John Sutherland FRS
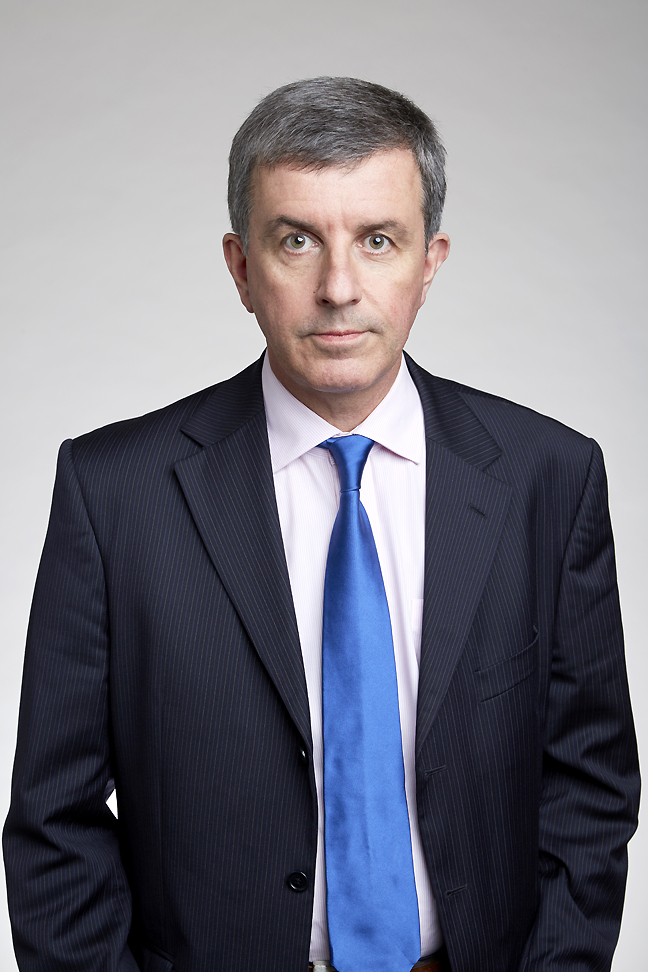
- Sutherland in 2017
- Born: John David Sutherland; 24 July 1962 (age 64)
- Education: University of Oxford
- Awards: Darwin Medal (2014); Tilden Prize (2011)
- Scientific career
- Fields: Chemistry
- Workplaces: University of Manchester; Laboratory of Molecular Biology
- Thesis: Genetic engineering of penicillin biosynthesis (1988)
- Doctoral advisor: Jack Baldwin
- Website: www2.mrc-lmb.cam.ac.uk/group-leaders/n-to-s/john-sutherland/

John David Sutherland (born 24 July 1962) is a British chemist at Medical Research Council (MRC), Laboratory of Molecular Biology (LMB), Protein & Nucleic Acid Chemistry Division. His work on the possible chemistry of early life has been widely recognised.

== Education ==
Sutherland obtained a Bachelor of Arts degree in chemistry from the University of Oxford as a student at Lincoln College, Oxford in 1984 and a Doctor of Philosophy degree supervised by Jack Baldwin at Balliol College, Oxford.

== Career and Research ==
Sutherland lectured organic chemistry at Oxford for eight years. In 1998 he accepted a position at the University of Manchester as Professor of Biological Chemistry, a position he held until 2010 before moving to Cambridge and the Medical Research Council (UK) Laboratory of Molecular Biology. Since 2013, he has been a Simons Investigator and member of the steering committee for the Simons Collaboration on the Origin of Life.

In 2009, Sutherland, along with Matthew Powner and Beatrice Gerland, detailed the first plausible prebiotic synthesis of activated pyrimidine nucleotides, which had previously been a significant problem for the RNA World hypothesis of early life emergence. Previous prebiotic syntheses of nucleotides had attempted to form them through assembly of their constituent parts, a nucleobase, sugar, and phosphate, but with only limited efficacy for purine nucleotides, and no success for pyrimidine nucleotides. However, Sutherland produced a synthesis resulting in the formation of β-ribocytidine-2',3' cyclic phosphate, a partially activated nucleotide, that is remarkable for its stereospecifity and yield. Instead of assembling the nucleotide components in stepwise linear reactions, the synthesis proceeds through the reaction of cyanoacetylene with an aminooxazole intermediate that is formed from glycolaldehyde and cyanamide, molecules that were likely present on early Earth.

In June 2012, Sutherland, along with his former colleague, the chemist Matthew Powner, from University College London, won the Origin of Life Challenge issued by Harry Lonsdale.

In 2015, in an article in Nature Chemistry, Sutherland demonstrated a plausible prebiotic scheme showing that the precursors of pyrimidine nucleotides formed from hydrogen cyanide can also form precursors of lipids and amino acids, providing significant evidence that early life may have emerged from a common chemistry on prebiotic Earth. His work has been heralded by his collaborator and Nobel-prize winning geneticist Jack Szostak as an important advance in understanding the origins of life.

He is a proponent of the emerging field known as systems chemistry.

=== Honours and awards ===
- 2009: The Max Tishler Prize Lectureship, Harvard University, USA
- 2011: The Royal Society of Chemistry Tilden Prize
- 2012: Co-winner of the Origin of Life Challenge
- 2014: The Royal Society Darwin Medal
- 2017: Elected Fellow of the Royal Society

=== Selected publications ===
- Powner, Matthew W.; Gerland, Beatrice; Sutherland, John D. (2009). "Synthesis of activated pyrimidine ribonucleotides in prebiotically plausible conditions". Nature. 459 (7244): 239–242. Bibcode:2009Natur.459..239P. doi:10.1038/nature08013. PMID 19444213. S2CID 4412117.
- Powner, Matthew W.; Sutherl, John D. (2011). "Prebiotic chemistry: a new modus operandi". Phil. Trans. R. Soc. B. 366 (1580): 2870–2877. doi:10.1098/rstb.2011.0134. PMC 3158916. PMID 21930577.
