= 2-Imidazolidinethione =

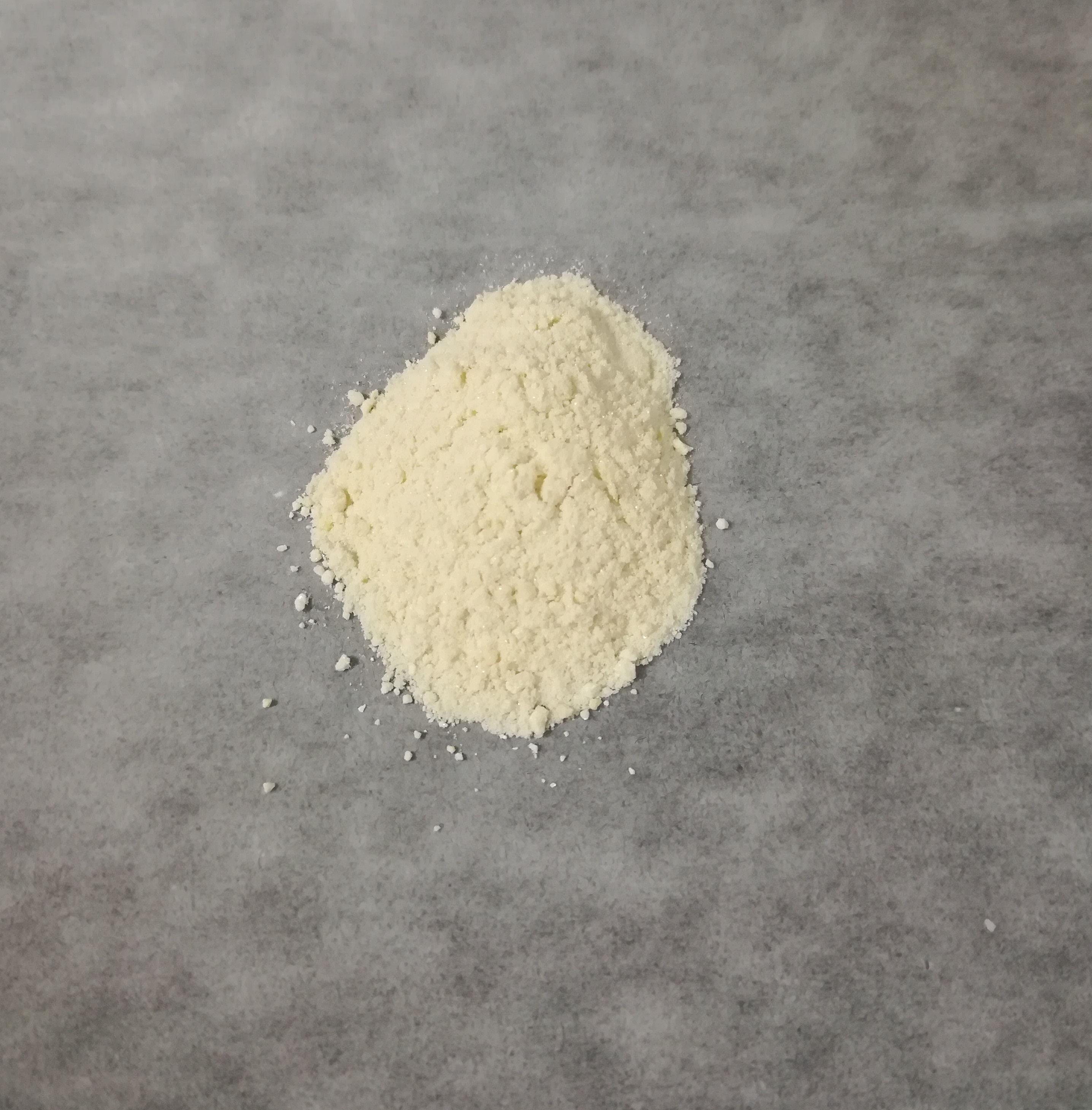

Names
- Preferred IUPAC name 1,5-Dihydro-2H-imidazole-2-thione
- Other names 2-Mercaptoimidazole

Identifiers
CAS Number	872-35-5
3D model (JSmol)	Interactive image
ChEMBL	ChEMBL3260774
ChemSpider	1013196
EC Number	212-823-4
PubChem CID	1201386
UNII	FD37BLD6L2
CompTox Dashboard (EPA)	DTXSID6061236
- InChI: InChI=1S/C3H4N2S/c6-3-4-1-2-5-3/h1-2H,(H2,4,5,6) Key: OXFSTTJBVAAALW-UHFFFAOYSA-N
- SMILES: C1=CNC(=S)N1

Properties
Chemical formula	C_{3}H_{4}N_{2}S
Molar mass	100.14 g·mol^{−1}
Appearance	white solid
Melting point	225–227 °C (437–441 °F; 498–500 K)

Hazards
- GHS labelling
Pictograms	(GHS07: Exclamation mark)
Signal word	Warning
Hazard statements	H315, H319, H335
Precautionary statements	P261, P264, P271, P280, P302+P352, P304+P340, P305+P351+P338, P312, P321, P332+P313, P337+P313, P362, P403+P233, P405, P501

Related compounds
Related compounds	Ethylene thiourea, Aminothiazole, 1,3-Dihydroimidazol-2-one (2-hydroxyimidazole)
- Except where otherwise noted, data are given for materials in their standard state (at 25 °C [77 °F], 100 kPa). Infobox references

2-Imidazolidinethione is the organosulfur compound with the formula C_{2}H_{2}(NH)_{2}C=S. It is a cyclic unsaturated thiourea with a short C=S bond length of 169 pm. The compound is often referred to as 2-mercaptoimidazole, which is a tautomer that is not observed. The compound forms a variety of metal complexes. In terms of bonding and reactivity, 2-imidazolidinethione is similar to mercaptobenzimidazole.
