= Homochirality =

Uniformity of handedness

Homochirality is a uniformity of chirality, or handedness. Objects are chiral when they cannot be superposed on their mirror images. For example, the left and right hands of a human are approximately mirror images of each other but are not the same as each other, so they are chiral. In chemistry, chirality is a geometric property of some compounds and ions. These compounds exist in two different chiral configurations, enantiomers, often described as the left-handed and right-handed isomers of a compound (denoted by L- (levorotatory to the left) and D- (dextrorotatory to the right), respectively, from how chiral molecules rotate plane-polarized light). The term homochiral is used to describe enantiopure samples of substances in which all the constituents are the same enantiomer.

Enantiomers have the same chemical properties in an achiral environment, so abiotic chemical processes typically produce racemic mixtures of chiral compounds, i.e., mixtures containing equal amounts of L- and D-isomers. However, many biologically-synthesized compounds are homochiral. For example, 19 of the 20 genetically-coded proteinogenic amino acids are left-handed, with exception of the achiral glycine, and biological sugars are right-handed.

Many theories have been proposed for the "function" of homochirality in nature: it may be a form of information storage and may reduce entropy barriers in the formation of large organized molecules. It has been experimentally verified that amino acids form large aggregates in larger abundance from enantiopure samples than from racemic ones. Enantiomeric impurities also impede RNA replication and chain elongation, processes central to both modern cellular processes like transcription and the RNA world hypothesis.

As homochirality is ubiquitous in extant biology, a key question in origins of life and prebiotic chemistry research is how biological homochirality could have arisen from racemic mixtures of the simple chemical building blocks of life. Many mechanisms for the origin of homochirality have been proposed. Some of these models propose three distinct steps: a mirror-symmetry breaking mechanism to create a minute enantiomeric imbalance (enantiomeric excess or ee) from a racemic mixture, subsequent chiral amplification to achieve a larger ee or full homochirality (i.e., ee=100%), and finally chiral transmission/propagation to transfer chirality from one set of molecules to another. In addition, another important consideration is the environmental plausibility of proposed mechanisms — whether a symmetry breaking, amplification, or propagation process could occur over relevant timescales and using only materials that could feasibly be available prebiotically under early Earth conditions.

== History of the term ==
Homochirality was introduced by Lord Kelvin in 1904, the year that he published his Baltimore Lecture of 1884. Kelvin used homochirality as a relationship between two molecules, i.e. two molecules are homochiral if they have the same chirality. Homochiral has been used in the same sense as enantiomerically pure. This is permitted in some journals (but not encouraged), its meaning in these journals being the preference of a process or system for a single optical isomer of a pair.

== In biology ==
Homochirality is a common characteristic of biological compounds, including the building blocks of macromolecules like nucleic acids and proteins. Amino acids, the building blocks of peptides and enzymes, appear almost exclusively in their left-handed form and all D-amino acids found in protein sequences are a result of post-translational modifications of the original L-amino acid. Ribose and deoxyribose, the sugar components of RNA and DNA nucleotide monomers, meanwhile, are all right-handed. Other cellular metabolites are also homochiral; for example, malate and isocitrate, two intermediates in the citric acid cycle, are homochiral in their L- and D- forms, respectively. In modern biology, enzymatic activity is what imposes homochirality on these metabolites and others, including hormones, toxins, fragrances and food flavors.

Biological organisms easily discriminate between molecules with different chiralities. This can affect physiological reactions such as smell and taste. Carvone, a terpenoid found in essential oils, smells like mint in its L-form and caraway in its R-form. Limonene tastes like citrus when right-handed and pine when left-handed.

Homochirality also affects the response to drugs. Thalidomide, in its left-handed form, cures morning sickness; in its right-handed form, it causes birth defects. Unfortunately, even if a pure left-handed version is administered, some of it can convert to the right-handed form in the patient. Many drugs are available as both a racemic mixture and an enantiopure drug . Depending on the manufacturing process, enantiopure forms can be more expensive to produce than stereochemical mixtures.

Chiral preferences can also be found at a macroscopic level. Snail shells can be right-turning or left-turning helices, but one form or the other is strongly preferred in a given species. In the edible snail Helix pomatia, only one out of 20,000 is left-helical. The coiling of plants can have a preferred chirality and even the chewing motion of cows has a 10% excess in one direction.

== Origins of biomolecular homochirality ==
Unsolved problem in chemistry
What is the origin of homochirality in living organisms?
More unsolved problems in chemistry

=== Symmetry breaking ===
Theories for the origin of homochirality in the molecules of life can be classified as deterministic or based on chance depending on their proposed mechanism. If there is a relationship between cause and effect – that is, a specific chiral field or influence causing the mirror symmetry breaking – the theory is classified as deterministic; otherwise it is classified as a theory based on chance (in the sense of randomness) mechanisms.

==== Deterministic theories ====
Deterministic theories can be divided into two subgroups: if the initial chiral influence took place in a specific space or time location (averaging zero over large enough areas of observation or periods of time), the theory is classified as local deterministic; if the chiral influence is permanent at the time the chiral selection occurred, then it is classified as universal deterministic. The classification groups for local determinist theories and theories based on chance mechanisms can overlap. Even if an external chiral influence produced the initial chiral imbalance in a deterministic way, the outcome sign could be random since the external chiral influence has its enantiomeric counterpart elsewhere.

In deterministic theories, the enantiomeric imbalance is created due to an external chiral field or influence, and the ultimate sign imprinted in biomolecules will be due to it. Deterministic mechanisms for the production of non-racemic mixtures from racemic starting materials include: asymmetric physical laws, such as the electroweak interaction (via cosmic rays) or asymmetric environments, such as those caused by circularly polarized light (CPL), quartz crystals, or the Earth's rotation, β-Radiolysis or the magnetochiral effect. Shortwave circularly polarized light, for example, can induce enantiomeric bias because chiral molecules will preferentially absorb either the right-handed or left-handed CPL.

===== Parity Violation =====
Parity, a physical property of symmetry, is conserved for strong, electromagnetic, and gravitational interactions. However, experimental work involving weak forces, such as the interactions between subatomic particles, found that parity is not conserved in these interactions (see Parity Violation). This theoretically would result in slight energy differences between mirror-image enantiomers of a single compound, which could cause a small stereochemical bias for the lower-energy enantiomer. However, a definitive relationship between molecular chirality and parity-violating energy differences have not yet been experimentally demonstrated.

===== Extraterrestrial origin of homochirality =====
Some analyses of organic molecules in extraterrestrial materials, such as carbonaceous chondrite meteorites and asteroids, identified small enantiomeric enrichments in a few L-amino acids and D-sugars, leading to the proposition that initial enantiomeric bias could have been seeded on Earth from space. That the enantiomeric biases measured in meteorites and astroids were consistent with that found in biology added credence to this idea, and experimental work showed plausible mechanisms for creating this enantiomeric bias in extraterrestrial materials.

It was hypothesized that circularly polarized light originating from Mie scattering on aligned interstellar dust particles may trigger the formation of an enantiomeric excess within chiral material in space. Interstellar and near-stellar magnetic fields can align dust particles in this fashion. Another speculation (the Vester-Ulbricht hypothesis) suggests that fundamental chirality of physical processes such as that of the beta decay (see Parity violation) leads to slightly different half-lives of biologically relevant molecules.

The amino acids in asteroids Bennu and Ryugu show no chiral bias. The Murchison meteorite contained only racemic amino acids.

==== Chance theories ====
Chance theories are based on the assumption that "Absolute asymmetric synthesis, i.e., the formation of enantiomerically enriched products from achiral precursors without the intervention of chiral chemical reagents or catalysts, is in practice unavoidable on statistical grounds alone".

=== Amplification ===
Most mechanisms of symmetry breaking focus on amplification of an initial stochastic enantiomeric excess. The most likely path for this amplification step is by asymmetric autocatalysis. An autocatalytic chemical reaction is that in which the reaction product is itself a reactive, in other words, a chemical reaction is autocatalytic if the reaction product is itself the catalyst of the reaction. In asymmetric autocatalysis, the catalyst is a chiral molecule, which means that a chiral molecule is catalyzing its own production. An initial enantiomeric excess, such as can be produced by polarized light, then allows the more abundant enantiomer to outcompete the other.

==== Theory ====
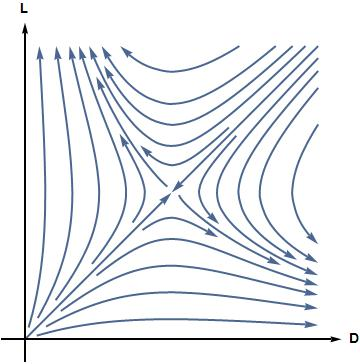
Phase portrait of Frank's model: starting from almost everywhere in L-D plane (except L = D line), the system approaches to one of the homochiral states (L=0 or D=0).

In 1953, Charles Frank proposed a model to demonstrate that homochirality is a consequence of autocatalysis. In his model the L and D enantiomers of a chiral molecule are autocatalytically produced from an achiral molecule A

$$\begin{align}
A + L \xrightarrow{k_a} 2L,\\
A + D \xrightarrow{k_a} 2D,
\end{align}$$

while suppressing each other through a reaction that he called mutual antagonism

$$\begin{align}
L + D \xrightarrow{k_d} \varnothing.\\
\end{align}$$

In this model the racemic state is unstable in the sense that the slightest enantiomeric excess will be amplified to a completely homochiral state. This can be shown by computing the reaction rates from the law of mass action:

$$\begin{align}
\frac{d[\ce L]}{dt} &= k_a [\ce A] [\ce L] - k_d \ce{[L] [D]}\\
\frac{d[\ce D]}{dt} &= k_a [\ce A] [\ce D] - k_d \ce{[L] [D]},
\end{align}$$

where $k_a$ is the rate constant for the autocatalytic reactions, $k_d$ is the rate constant for mutual antagonism reaction, and the concentration of A is kept constant for simplicity.

The analytical solutions for are found to be $[L]/[D] = [L]_0/[D]_0\,e^{{kd([L]_0-[D]_0)(e^{k_a t}-1)}}$ . The ratio $[L]/[D]$ increases at a more than exponential rate if $([L]_0-[D]_0)$ is positive (and vice versa). Every starting conditions different to

$[L]_0 = [D]_0$ lead to one of the asymptotes $[L] = 0$ or $[D] = 0$. Thus the equality of $[L]_0$ and $[D]_0$ and so of $[L]$ and $[D]$ represents a condition of unstable equilibrium, this result depending on the presence of the term representing mutual antagonism.

By defining the enantiomeric excess $ee$ as

$$ee = \frac{[\ce D] - [\ce L]}{[\ce D] + [\ce L]},$$

the rate of change of enantiomeric excess can be calculated using chain rule from the rate of change of the concentrations of enantiomers L and D.

$$\frac{d(ee)}{dt} = \left(\frac{2k_d \ce{[L] [D]}}{[\ce D] + [\ce L]}\right)ee.$$

Linear stability analysis of this equation shows that the racemic state $ee = 0$ is unstable. Starting from almost everywhere in the concentration space, the system evolves to a homochiral state.

It is generally understood that autocatalysis alone does not yield homochirality, and the presence of the mutually antagonistic relationship between the two enantiomers is necessary for the instability of the racemic mixture. Homochirality could be achieved from autocatalysis in the absence of the mutually antagonistic relationship, but the underlying mechanism for symmetry-breaking is different.

==== Experiments ====
A small amount of one enantiomer at the start of a reaction can lead to a large enantioenrichment in the product. For example, the Soai reaction is autocatalytic. If the reaction is started with some of one of the product enantiomers already present, the product can catalyze the production of more of that same enantiomer.

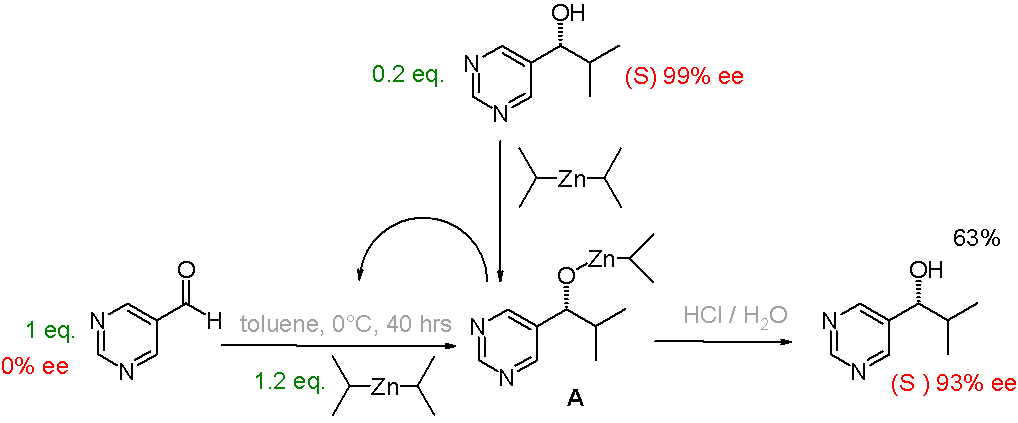

For the proline catalyzed aminoxylation of propionaldehyde by nitrosobenzene, a slight enantiomeric excess of catalyst leads to a large enantiomeric excess of product.

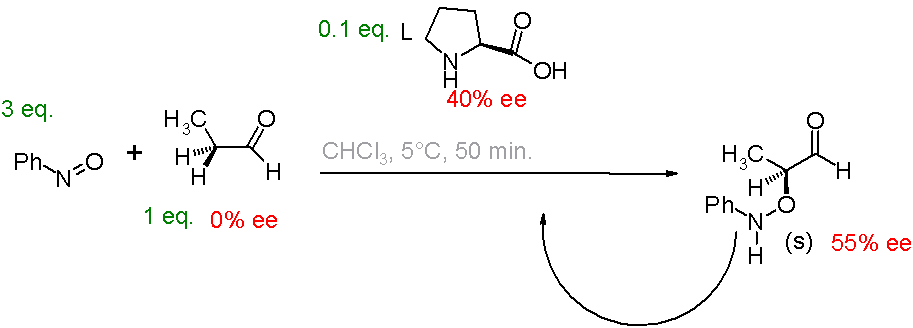

Serine octamer clusters containing 8 serine molecules appear in mass spectrometry. No evidence supports such clusters existing under non-ionizing conditions, however. Fractional sublimation of a 10% enantioenriched sample of leucine results in up to 82% enrichment in the sublimate. Partial sublimation processes could in principle take place on the surface of meteors where large variations in temperature exist. This finding may have consequences for the development of the Mars Organic Detector scheduled for launch in 2013 which aims to recover trace amounts of amino acids from the Mars surface exactly by a sublimation technique.

A high asymmetric amplification of the enantiomeric excess of sugars are also present in the amino acid catalyzed asymmetric formation of carbohydrates

Sodium chlorate, which crystallizes in a chiral habit, can deposit almost single enantiomers of crystals when evaporating solutions are stirred. This effect, illustrates the role of seed crystals in nucleation process.

In a related experiment, a crystal suspension of a racemic amino acid derivative continuously stirred, results in a 100% crystal phase of one of the enantiomers because the enantiomeric pair is able to equilibrate in solution (compare with dynamic kinetic resolution).

=== Transmission ===
Once a significant enantiomeric enrichment has been produced in a single biomolecule or biological class of molecules in a system, the transference of chirality through the entire system is possible. This last step is known as the chiral transmission or propagation step. Independently achieving homochirality in every biomolecule (e.g., creating significant enantiomeric enrichment or complete homochirality for all 19 chiral amino acids separately) would be statistically improbable for compounds with different physical and chemical properties and has not yet been experimentally demonstrated. Stereoselective pressure from one biomolecule or biological class to others would eliminate the need to supply all prebiotically-relevant biological precursors in their enantiopure form.

Some proposed models for the transmission of chiral asymmetry are polymerization, epimerization or copolymerization. Experimental work has demonstrated that enantiomerically enriched amino acids could assert chiral pressure on sugars and RNA precursors, and vice versa. For example, laboratory experiments demonstrated enantioenrichment of the 3-carbon sugar D-glyceraldehyde from a racemic solution via the interaction of L-proline-valine dipeptide. Furthermore, the stereoselective preference of D-aminoacyl-RNA for L-amino acids in nonenzymatic aminoacylation reactions provide a prebiotically plausible mechanism of chiral information transfer.

=== The hypothesized central dogma of biological homochirality ===
Common criticisms of previously proposed mechanisms of symmetry breaking, amplification, or transmission include that they only induce an enantiomeric excess in one class of biological compounds, that the induced enantiomeric excess is not high enough or cannot persist for long enough for full homochirality to be achieved, or that the mechanism is not plausible under prebiotic conditions on the early Earth. In the early 2020s, a framework for achieving homochirality across all major biological molecule classes was proposed. This framework includes two major elements: resolving enantiomeric purity in a prebiotically plausible RNA precursor, and the subsequent propagation of chiral information from homochiral nucleic acids to proteins and metabolites. This framework was posited to be the "central dogma of biological homochirality," paralleling Francis Crick's central dogma of molecular biology, which outlines the flow of genetic information from DNA to RNA to proteins.

==== Ribose aminooxazoline (RAO), a critical RNA precursor molecule ====
Ribose aminooxazoline (RAO) is a pentose aminooxazoline, first identified in 1970 as an important intermediate for ribonucleotide biosynthesis when it was shown to produce α-cytidine, a stereoisomer of the biologically-produced nucleoside β-cytidine. Over three decades later, the abiotic synthesis of RAO was achieved from the reaction of cyanamide and the simple 2- and 3-carbon compounds glycoaldehyde and glyceraldehyde, a demonstration of prebiotically feasible cyanosulfidic chemistry. Subsequent research additionally established an abiotic pathway from RAO to the pyrimidine ribonucleosides β-cytidine and β-uridine, revealing a plausible synthetic pathway to RNA monomers from simple chemical precursors that could have been available on the early Earth. Research into the synthesis of purine ribonucleosides is still underway, although a pathway from RAO to purine deoxyribonucleosides has been elucidated.

==== Symmetry-breaking and chiral amplification of ribose aminooxazoline (RAO) ====
The chirality of the ribose sugar in RAO is conserved in its transformation into ribonucleotides, so obtaining RAO in its enantiopure form could lead to the formation of homochiral RNA. Experimental work shows that enantiopure RAO could be achieved via the interaction of a racemic mixture of RAO and a spin-polarized magnetic surface, such as the surface of the prebiotically abundant mineral magnetite, due to the chirality-induced spin selectivity (CISS) effect and the unique conglomerate crystallization properties of RAO (i.e. its tendency to crystallize as enantiopure crystals). In combination, these two processes can provide symmetry-breaking and amplification mechanisms for the isolation of enantiopure RAO from an initial racemic starting mixture.

The CISS effect is a physical phenomena that describes the strong interaction of an electron's linear momentum and spin with a chiral molecule's electrostatic potential, allowing chiral molecules to preferentially interact with electrons of a particular spin due to lower energy spin-exchange interactions. This process explains the observation that an enantiopure layer of chiral molecules can selectively filter for electrons of a particular spin. In reverse, the CISS effect provides a symmetry breaking mechanism for RAO: spin-polarized electrons on a magnetic surface (i.e. electrons that have a net spin alignment in a particular direction) preferentially interact with one enantiomer of RAO, seeding its crystallization. Essentially, a spin-polarized magnetic surface acts as a chiral agent that initiates the adsorption and initial crystallization of one enantiomer of the relatively insoluble RAO.

Furthermore, RAO displays conglomerate crystallization behavior, so homochiral RAO can be isolated from a racemic mixture provided that initial seeds are of a single enantiomer. The enantioselective crystallization of RAO on a magnetic surface results in an enantiomeric excess, although on early Earth magnetic surfaces (e.g., magnetite sediments) this initial ee would be small due to nonuniformities in the magnetization of the surface. This occurs because Earth's geomagnetic field only induces a weak magnetization on ferromagnetic minerals. However, due to the CISS effect, interaction between initial enantiopure RAO crystals would strengthen the net magnetization of the magnetic surface which would in turn allow for increased chiral selectivity in RAO adsorption, resulting in a positive feedback loop between surface electron spin-polarization and RAO chiral purity. Accordingly, multiple RAO dissolution and recrystallization cycles could amplify an initial CISS effect-induced enantiomeric excess to full homochirality. Experimental results indicate that full homochirality (ee=100%) can be achieved in only two crystallization steps.

==== Propagating homochirality from nucleic acids through a chemical network ====
Resolving homochiral RAO provides a path to homochiral RNA, which can function as both a hereditary and catalytic molecule in primitive life (see RNA world). This means that homochirality could be preserved during RNA replication, and that RNA-templated peptide synthesis could be stereoselective for amino acids. In modern cellular biology, aminoacyl-tRNA synthetases stereoselectively attach L-amino acids to D-tRNA molecule, an essential step in RNA-templated protein synthesis and a demonstration of chiral information transfer from nucleic acids to amino acids. Experimental work with prebiotic analogs of nonenzymatic aminoacyl-RNA reactions have shown that they also exhibit chiral selectivity for amino acids. For example, aminoacyl-RNA loop-closing ligation, a reaction important for increasing the stability of aminoacylated RNA and for formation of functional catalytic RNA, proceeds at up to a 200 times faster rate when D-RNA is aminoacylated with L-amino acids, and the inverse stereoselectivity is observed for L-RNA.

Once homochiral peptides are produced from homochiral nucleic acids, stereoselectively could subsequently be imposed on other metabolites through the eventual development of enzyme-catalyzed reactions, just as in modern biology. Alternatively, homochiral ribozymes, thought to catalyze prebiotic chemical reactions prior to proteinaceous enzymes in the RNA world hypothesis, could have also propagated chirality to metabolic intermediates.

==== Possible prebiotic environments ====
The symmetry-breaking and chiral amplification of racemic RAO only requires a prebiotic environment where RAO is available and can interact with spin-polarized magnetic surfaces. One suggested environment is an evaporative lake with magnetic sediments, such as magnetite or greigite, which gain a statistically uniform net magnetization on a hemisphere scale from the Earth's geomagnetic field. These environments could have been widespread on the early Earth, and wet-drying cycling within and at the edges of these lakes could facilitate both crystallization and replenishment of RAO, along with other prebiotic precursors important for early life.

==== Drawbacks ====
This mechanism for resolving biological homochirality relies heavily on the prebiotic synthesis of RAO, and assumes that it is the prebiotic precursor to nucleic acids. The crystallization efficiency of compounds depends on their concentration, and RAO would need to be saturated in solution for enantioselective crystallization to occur. This could be achieved through frequent wet-dry cycles, which would also remove diastereomers of RAO which are also produced in prebiotic reactions and can modify its crystal habit.

=== Biotic Theory ===
Most contemporary research into the origin of homochirality focuses on identifying abiotic mechanisms for chiral symmetry-breaking, amplification, and propagation/transmission that could have occurred during prebiotic synthesis of biomolecule precursors or during primitive replication/polymerization. Some early theories of biological homochirality in the 1950s suggested that homochiral biopolymers of both enantiomeric forms (e.g., both D-RNA and L-RNA) could have been present in the prebiotic Earth, and that polymers of the canonical enantiomeric forms were selected for due to improved chemical function. As an extension of this idea, it was also proposed that lifeforms containing both enantiomeric forms of molecular machinery could have arisen independently, and that evolution by natural selection eventually led to the complete dominance of one enantiomeric lifeform. This purely biotic theory is difficult to assess experimentally, and is not widely accepted or discussed in the scientific community.

== Optical resolution in racemic amino acids ==
No theory explains the prevalence of L-amino acids. If one takes, for example, alanine, which has a small methyl group, and phenylalanine, which has a larger benzyl group, a simple question is in what aspect, L-alanine resembles L-phenylalanine more than D-phenylalanine, and what kind of mechanism causes the selection of all L-amino acids, because it might be possible that alanine was L and phenylalanine was D.

== See also ==
- Chiral life concept – of artificially synthesizing a chiral-mirror version of life
- CIP system
- Pfeiffer effect
- Stereochemistry
- Unsolved problems in chemistry
