= Mercaptobenzimidazole =

Names
- Preferred IUPAC name 1,3-Dihydro-2H-1,3-benzimidazole-2-thione

Identifiers
CAS Number	583-39-1
3D model (JSmol)	Interactive image
ChEMBL	ChEMBL70141
ChemSpider	616466
ECHA InfoCard	100.008.640
EC Number	604-756-8; 209-502-6
PubChem CID	707035
RTECS number	DE1050000
UNII	619CVM6HOK
UN number	2811
CompTox Dashboard (EPA)	DTXSID9025536
- InChI: InChI=1S/C7H6N2S/c10-7-8-5-3-1-2-4-6(5)9-7/h1-4H,(H2,8,9,10) Key: YHMYGUUIMTVXNW-UHFFFAOYSA-N
- SMILES: C1=CC=C2C(=C1)NC(=S)N2

Properties
Chemical formula	C_{7}H_{6}N_{2}S
Molar mass	150.20 g·mol^{−1}
Appearance	white solid
Density	1.42 g/cm^{3}
Melting point	298 °C (568 °F; 571 K)

Hazards
- GHS labelling
Pictograms	(GHS07: Exclamation mark) (GHS08: Health hazard) (GHS09: Environmental hazard)
Signal word	Warning
Hazard statements	H302, H332, H361, H373, H410
Precautionary statements	P201, P202, P260, P264, P270, P271, P273, P281, P301+P312, P304+P312, P304+P340, P308+P313, P312, P314, P330, P391, P405, P501
- Except where otherwise noted, data are given for materials in their standard state (at 25 °C [77 °F], 100 kPa). Infobox references

Mercaptobenzimidazole is the organosulfur compound with the formula C_{6}H_{4}(NH)_{2}C=S. It is the mercaptan of benzimidazole. It is a white solid that has been investigated as a corrosion inhibitor. The name is a misnomer because the compound is a thiourea, characterized with a short C=S bond length of 169 pm. A similar situation applies to 2-mercaptoimidazole, which is also a thiourea properly called 2-imidazolidinethione and mercaptobenzothiazole, which is also a thioamide.

It is prepared from o-phenylenediamine.
