= Ribose aminooxazoline =

Names
- IUPAC name (3aS,5R,6R,6aR)-2-Amino-5-(hydroxymethyl)-3a,5,6,6a-tetrahydrofuro[2,3-d][1,3]oxazol-6-ol
- Other names D-Ribofuranosyl aminooxazoline

Identifiers
CAS Number	27963-97-9
3D model (JSmol)	Interactive image
Abbreviations	RAO
ChEMBL	ChEMBL2133684
ChemSpider	250081
PubChem CID	10888406
- InChI: InChI=1S/C6H10N2O4/c7-6-8-5-4(12-6)3(10)2(1-9)11-5/h2-5,9-10H,1H2,(H2,7,8)/t2-,3-,4-,5+/m1/s1 Key: IVFVSTOFYHUJRU-AIHAYLRMSA-N
- SMILES: C([C@@H]1[C@H]([C@@H]2[C@H](O1)N=C(O2)N)O)O

Properties
Chemical formula	C_{6}H_{10}N_{2}O_{4}
Molar mass	174.156 g·mol^{−1}
- Except where otherwise noted, data are given for materials in their standard state (at 25 °C [77 °F], 100 kPa). Infobox references

Ribose aminooxazoline (RAO) is a bicyclic pentose aminooxazoline that plays a central role in the prebiotic synthesis of RNA. RAO is a key intermediate in the cyanosulfidic synthesis pathway leading to the prebiotic formation of canonical pyrimidine ribonucleosides. The formation of RAO within the cyanosulfidic reaction network bypasses an otherwise improbable formation of N-glycosidic bonds between nucleobases and ribose sugars. RAO possesses low solubility in comparison to other pentose aminooxazolines, forming chemically stable RAO crystals capable of undergoing chiral enrichment under ambient conditions. RAO's enantiomers form distinct crystals with unique lattice arrangements, which can interact with magnetic surfaces to preferentially make homochiral RAO. Because of this, RAO has emerged as a compelling intermediate of prebiotic synthesis to explain the early emergence of biochemical homochirality inherited by all life on Earth.

== Chemical structure, properties, and synthesis pathway ==
RAO is a bicyclic heterocyclic compound consisting of a pentose oxazoline with an amine group attached at the C2' position (2-aminooxazoline) and a ribose configured pentose sugar. The hydroxyl bearing carbons are in the C2' and C3' positions in a cis arrangement distinguishing this from arabino-aminooxazoline (AAO) where the hydroxyl bearing carbons are in a trans configuration.

=== Synthesis pathway ===
The synthesis pathway, first described by Powner et al. 2009, begins with a standing stock of cyanamide, glycolaldehyde, and glyceraldehyde with inorganic phosphate in an aqueous solution. First, a condensation reaction of cyanamide with glycolaldehyde yields 2-aminooxazole. The 2-aminooxazole then acquires glyceraldehyde yielding the bicyclic pentose aminooxazoline. In addition to RAO, three other aminooxazoline stereoisomers are also produced through this reaction pathway, arabino-, xylose-, and lyxose-. Powner et al. 2009 report an exceptionally high yield of pentose aminooxazoline when in the presence of inorganic phosphate buffering the solution at neutral pH. While all four stereoisomers are synthesized in a racemic mixture, ribo- and arabino- stereoisomers dominated the product solution.

While produced in comparable proportions (~30% and 40% yield for ribo- and arabino-, respectively), RAO possesses comparatively lower solubility in water. This low solubility results in pure RAO crystals effectively removing the RAO from the bulk solution mixture. Crystallization of RAO provides a mechanism of chemical purification whereby RAO becomes efficiently isolated from the other stereoisomers in solution. Further work by Xu et al. 2016 found that, given a non-racemic mixture of glyceraldehyde during synthesis, RAO can crystallize with enantiomeric enrichment. This is due to the fact that the enantiomers of RAO form separate and distinct crystals, providing not only a mechanism for bulk chemical purification but also for chiral enrichment.

== Role in cyanosulfidic protometabolism ==
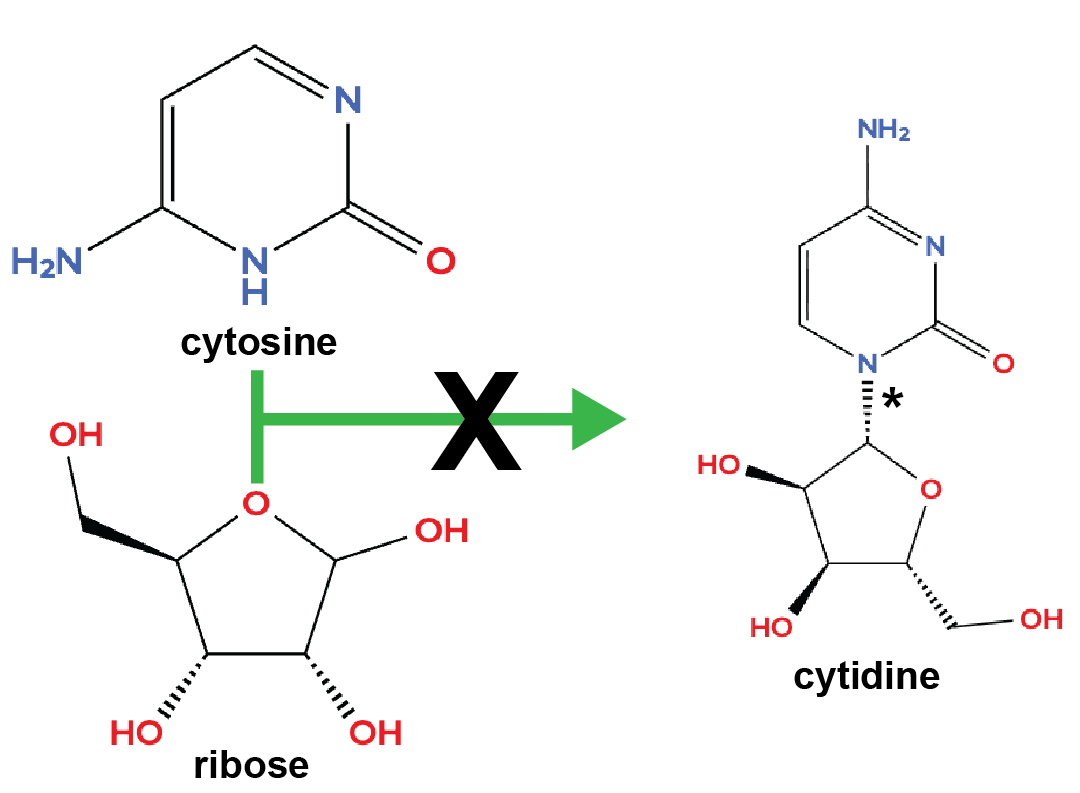
Classical prebiotic synthesis pathway to nucleosides. Here ribose and the nucleotide are formed by way of two independent pathways requiring them to finally join via a thermodynamically difficult N-glycosidic bond (marked with an asterisk). Figure adapted from Peretó (2019).

The origin of life requires a route from simple molecules to complex biological polymers. Cyanosulfidic protometabolism is a prebiotic synthesis pathway from simple monomers to polymers eventually leading to the origin of precursor molecules of the key building blocks of life, amino acids, ribonucleotides, and lipids. The proposed cyanosulfidic pathway has received considerable attention because it needs only a small number of starting reagents, which are all compatible with plausible early Earth conditions. Specifically, cyanosulfidic protometabolism requires only three initial standing stocks: (1) hydrogen cyanide, (2) hydrogen sulfide, and (3) inorganic phosphate in the presence of water and ultraviolet light. Within the cyanosulfidic reaction framework, RAO is an environmentally stable RNA precursor.

Variations of cyanosulfidic synthesis can make both pyrimidine and purine ribonucleosides, and RAO is a key intermediate for pyrimidine synthesis. For discussion on the synthesis pathway for purine ribonucleosides, see Stairs et al. (2017) and Feldmann et al. (2023). Prior to the cyanosulfidic protometabolic pathway being introduced, it was assumed that ribonucleotides were synthesized from two independently formed components, a nucleobase produced from hydrogen cyanide and a pentose sugar produced from formaldehyde. However, this idea does not work. The final step requires a ribose and a nucleobase to combine by way of a N-glycosidic bond which has been experimentally proven to be extraordinarily difficult, rendering this prebiotic pathway to ribonucleoside formation highly improbable.

The cyanosulfidic reaction scheme offers a means in which to bypass the need for a ribose and a nucleobase to directly react via N-glycosidic bond via the formation of RAO. Pyrimidine ribonucleotides are synthesized in of the following steps:

1. RAO reacts with a standing stock of cyanoacetylene producing ribose anhydronucleoside.
2. Ribose anhydronucleoside undergoes thiolysis in the presence of hydrogen sulfide and formamide producing α-2-thioribocytidine.
3. α-2-thioribocytidine then undergoes photoanomerization to β-2-thioribocytidine upon exposure to ultraviolet light.
4. In the presence of inorganic phosphate and formamide, β-2-thioribocytidine undergoes phosphorylation to the canonical pyrimidine nucleotide, cytidine monophosphate.
5. Finally, irradiation by ultraviolet light transforms cytidine monophosphate to an additional canonical pyrimidine nucleotide, uridine monophosphate.

== Role in the emergence of homochirality ==
RAO offers a plausible solution to the prebiotic need for homochirality. Its ability to become enantiomerically enriched offers a route to chirally pure monomers, and subsequent polymers, early in the origin of life. This early chiral amplification enables the inheritance of enantiomeric preference in emerging RNA, laying the foundation for the modern correlation between nucleic acid and amino acid handedness. RAO's role in the early emergence of homochirality is especially compelling due to the fact that its enantiomeric enrichment has been explained purely by means of environmental conditions plausible on early Earth. Once homochiral RNA forms, data suggest that right handed (D-) transfer RNAs preferentially bind with left handed (L-) amino acids thus leading to left handed proteins. So, homochiral RNA propagates homochially in proteins.

=== Experimental basis for RAO as a homochiral precursor ===
RAO playing a central role in the emergence in RNA homochriality is based on fact that both D-RAO and L-RAO form distinct crystals with unique crystallographic properties. The electron density of a chiral molecule supplies a dipole moment as it approaches a surface. In the presence of a magnetic field, chiral symmetry is broken due to the chiral-induced spin selectivity effect (CISS). This results in a single enantiomeric interaction with a magnetic surface being energetically favorable, leading to a kinetic entrapment of that enantiomer at the surface. Because of RAO's low solubility, the entrapped enantiomer begins to precipitate onto the magnetic surface with enantiomeric enrichment, like a seed crystal. The handedness of the kinetically trapped RAO depends on the direction of the magnetic field applied.

=== Environmental setting facilitating RAO's homochirality on early Earth ===
A shallow, closed-basin evaporative lake has been proposed as the most plausible environmental scenario in facilitating RAO's magnetically induced homochirality. Within such an environment, anoxic waters rich in dissolved iron facilitate the precipitation of authigenic magnetite aligned with Earth's magnetic field. A stream flowing into a closed basin might carry a racemic mixture of pentose aminooxazolines. As the lake evaporates, crystallization of RAO occurs, purifying RAO from the pentose aminooxazoline mixture. Wet-dry cycles can re-dissolve and re-precipitate RAO on the magnetite-rich the surface. This process allows for a positive feedback between the magnetic surface to make homochiral RAO crystals. Higher magnetization induces higher enantiomeric enrichment with each crystallization cycle, eventually reaching an enantiopure D-RAO pool for subsequent homochiral RNA synthesis.
