= Cyanosulfidic prebiotic synthesis =

Proposed mechanism for pre-biotic synthesis of complex organics

Cyanosulfidic prebiotic synthesis is a proposed mechanism for the origin of the key chemical building blocks of life. It involves a systems chemistry approach to synthesize the precursors of amino acids, ribonucleotides, and lipids using the same starting reagents and largely the same plausible early Earth conditions. Cyanosulfidic prebiotic synthesis was developed by John Sutherland and co-workers at the Laboratory of Molecular Biology in Cambridge, England.

== Challenges ==
Prebiotic synthesis of amino acids, nucleobases, lipids, and other building blocks of protocells and metabolisms is still poorly understood. Proposed reactions that produce individual components are the Strecker synthesis of amino acids, the formose reaction for the production of sugars, and prebiotic syntheses for the production of nucleobases. These syntheses often rely on different starting reagents, different conditions (temperature, pH, catalysts, etc.), and often will interfere with each other. These challenges have made determining the conditions for the origin of life difficult. Researchers have turned to systems chemistry type approaches to help overcome some of these challenges. Systems chemistry approaches form multiple products from a single synthesis under the same conditions and tend to be more similar to biological processes in that they have emergent properties, self-organization, and autocatalysis. Cyanosulfidic prebiotic synthesis is a systems chemistry approach.

== Pathway ==
The starting reactants for these reactions are hydrogen cyanide (HCN) as well as HCN derivatives and acetylene. Both of these are hypothesized to have been present on the early Earth. The reactions occur at 35 °C under oxygen-free conditions. The early Earth was anoxic before the great oxidation event, making these conditions plausible. In the laboratory synthesis, a phosphate buffer was used to maintain a stable, neutral pH. Hydrogen sulfide (H2S) is used as a reductant in these reactions. The reactions are driven forward by ultraviolet radiation and catalyzed by Cu(I)-Cu(II) photoredox cycling. Some compounds in the system perform multiple roles. For example, phosphate serves as a buffer to maintain a neutral pH, serves as a catalyst in the synthesis of 2-aminooxazole and urea, and is a precursor to glycerol-3-phosphate and ribonucleotides. Products include precursors of many amino acids, the precursors of lipids, and ribonucleotides. An important intermediate is ribose aminooxazoline, which can crystallize with preferential chirality and enable the eventual synthesis of homochiral RNA. The amino acid precursors could then be produced by Strecker synthesis reactions. Cyanosulfidic metabolism also can produce the precursors of both purines and pyrimidines ribonucleotides simultaneously. Many of the compounds produced also include intermediates in one-carbon metabolism.

Table I: Products of Cyanosulfidic Protometabolism
Product	Precursor to	Precursor Type
2-aminoacetonitrile	Glycine	Amino acid
2-Aminopropanenitrile	Alanine	Amino acid
2-Amino-3-hydroxypropanenitrile	Serine	Amino acid
2-amino-3-hydroxybutanenitrile	Threonine	Amino acid
2-amino-4-methylpentanenitrile	Leucine	Amino acid
α-D-ribofuranosyl uridine-2',3'-cyclic phosphate	Uridine monophosphate	ribonucleotide
2-aminosuccinonitrile	Asparagine, Aspartic acid	Amino acid
2-aminopentanedinitrile	Glutamic acid, Glutamine	Amino acid
pyrrolidine-2-carbonitrile	Proline	Amino acid
amino((4-amino-4-cyanobutyl)amino)methaniminium	Arginine	Amino acid
α-D-ribofuranosyl cytidine-2',3'-cyclic phosphate	Cytidine monophosphate	ribonucleotide
glycerol-1-phosphate	phosopholipids	Lipid
2-amino-3-methylbutanenitrile	Valine	Amino acid

== Geochemical context ==
The cyanosulfidic synthesis is proposed on the early Earth. Meteorite impact supply HCN, phosphate, and sulfide. Wet-dry cycles, geothermal heating, ultraviolet radiation, and geochemical gradients may contribute. The proposed geochemical scenario also relies on flow chemistry concepts to introduce new reactants throughout the process to cause additional chemical reactions and syntheses to occur.

== Limitations ==
Cyanosulfidic chemistry has several limitations. While the products are all formed from the same starting materials, many of the reactions require the periodic delivery of new reagents which complicates the syntheses. The chemical synthesis is therefore not truly “one-pot” chemistry which would require all reactants to be provided at the beginning with no further alterations. Sutherland and colleagues argue that a “flow-chemistry” approach featuring the movement of compounds through a stream experiencing different geochemical conditions makes their proposed system plausible.

== Variants ==
Other challenges of the cyanosulfidic prebiotic synthesis approach are that the reductant, sulfide, has low solubility in water except in alkaline conditions, and that the main catalyst, copper, has a relatively low abundance in Earth’s crust. To address these problems, an alternative scheme for prebiotic systems chemistry called cyanosulfitic prebiotic synthesis has been proposed. This set of reactions relies on sulfite, instead of sulfide, and ferrocyanide to catalyze reactions when exposed to ultraviolet light. The products of these reactions rely on similar chemistry to cyanofidic mechanisms, such as reductive homologation, and produce similar products such as amino acid precursors as well as sugars and hydroxy acids. Both sulfite (from sulfur dioxide released by volcanoes) and ferrous iron (FeII) are hypothesized to have been present in high quantities on the early Earth, suggesting that this is potentially a much more feasible set of reactions.
