= List of unsolved problems in chemistry =

This is a list of notable unsolved problems in chemistry. Problems in chemistry are considered unsolved when an expert in the field considers it unsolved or when several experts in the field disagree about a solution to a problem.

== Physical chemistry problems ==
- Can the transition temperature of high-temperature superconductors be brought up to room temperature?
- How do the spin–orbit coupling, other relativistic corrections, and inter-electron effects modify the chemistry of the trans-actinides?
- Is it possible to create a practically useful lithium–air battery?
- How do ions dynamically coordinate and evolve in bulk, interfacial, and confined environments within ultra-concentrated and solid-state electrochemical systems?
- How does the full nuclear quantum effect of hydrogen systematically govern the phase behavior, hydrogen bonding, and anomalous properties of water?
- How can photon energy be efficiently converted into chemical energy, such as splitting water to produce hydrogen, at low cost and high efficiency?
- Can configurational entropy thermodynamically drive the dynamic equilibrium between sintered nanoparticles and atomically dispersed catalysts at high temperatures?
- How do single-atom catalysts dynamically evolve under real operating conditions, and how can multi-electron reactions be kinetically enhanced?
- How do relativistic effects alter the chemical properties of superheavy elements beyond Z=137, and does the periodic table have a definite end?

== Organic chemistry problems ==
- What is the origin of homochirality in biomolecules?
- Why are accelerated kinetics observed for some organic reactions at the water-organic interface?
- Do replacement reactions of aryl diazonium salts (dediazotizations) predominantly undergo S_{N}1 or a radical mechanism?
- Can an electrochemical cell reliably perform organic redox reactions?
- Which "classic organic chemistry" reactions admit chiral catalysts?
  - Is it possible to construct a quaternary carbon atom with arbitrary (distinguishable) substituents and stereochemistry?
- Can artificial enzymes replace the need for protecting groups when modifying sensitive compounds?
- Can a unified catalytic strategy be developed to construct all-carbon quaternary stereocenters with arbitrary substituents and high enantioselectivity?
- How can the non-radiative decay pathways of photo-excited organic molecules be precisely controlled to maximize quantum yields in artificial photosynthesis?
- Is it possible to achieve the total synthesis of complex mechanically interlocked molecules (such as high-order catenanes) through purely thermodynamic self-assembly without kinetic trapping?
- Can machine learning models accurately predict the reactivity and selectivity of novel organic transformations solely based on molecular graph representations, bypassing traditional quantum chemical calculations?
- What are the fundamental limits of “click chemistry” in terms of bioorthogonality and reaction kinetics within the crowded environment of a living cell?
- Can dynamic covalent chemistry be harnessed to create adaptive materials that exhibit true evolutionary behavior and self-repair capabilities under ambient conditions?

== Inorganic chemistry problems ==
- Are there any molecules that certainly contain a phi bond?
- Is there a less labor- or energy-intensive technique for titanium refinement than the Kroll process?
- Does nitrogen admit metastable allotropes under standard conditions?
- Can new solvents or other techniques make direct carbon capture economical?
  - Can artificial photosynthesis make any common fuels?
- What is a reliable synthesis and stabilization method for catenary allotropes of sulfur and carbon?
- Can the synthesis and stabilization of noble gas compounds (beyond xenon) under ambient conditions become routine?
- Is it possible to design transition metal catalysts that completely bypass the use of critical rare-earth metals?
- What is the most efficient and scalable method for the industrial synthesis and purification of high-entropy alloys?
- Can metal-organic frameworks (MOFs) achieve long-term hydrolytic stability sufficient for real-world industrial applications?
- Is there a scalable alternative to current industrial ammonia synthesis that operates at room temperature and atmospheric pressure?

== Analytical chemistry problems ==
- Can single-molecule detection be routinely achieved for non-fluorescent analytes in complex biological matrices without amplification?
- Is it possible to develop universal calibration-free sensors that maintain accuracy across varying environmental conditions and sample matrices?
- How can in operando analytical techniques bridge the “pressure gap” and “material gap” between idealized surface science models and real-world catalytic interfaces?
- Can artificial intelligence fully automate the interpretation of multi-dimensional hyphenated data (e.g., LC-MS-NMR) to identify unknown trace contaminants with human-expert reliability?

== Biochemistry problems ==
- Enzyme kinetics: Why do some enzymes exhibit faster-than-diffusion kinetics?
- Protein folding problem: Is it possible to predict the secondary, tertiary and quaternary structure of a polypeptide sequence based solely on the sequence and environmental information? Inverse protein-folding problem: Is it possible to design a polypeptide sequence which will adopt a given structure under certain environmental conditions? This has been achieved for several small globular proteins in recent years. In 2020, it was announced that Google's AlphaFold, a neural network based on DeepMind artificial intelligence, is capable of predicting a protein's final shape based solely on its amino-acid chain with an accuracy of around 90% on a test sample of proteins used by the team.
- RNA folding problem: Is it possible to accurately predict the secondary, tertiary and quaternary structure of a polyribonucleic acid sequence based on its sequence and environment?
- Protein design: Is it possible to design highly active enzymes de novo for any desired reaction?
- Biosynthesis: Can desired molecules, natural products or otherwise, be produced in high yield through biosynthetic pathway manipulation?

== See also ==
- Lists of unsolved problems
- Outline of chemistry
