= Serine octamer cluster =

Unusually stable cluster consisting of eight serine molecules

The Serine octamer cluster in physical chemistry is an unusually stable cluster consisting of eight serine molecules (Ser) implicated in the origin of homochirality. This cluster was first discovered in mass spectrometry experiments. Electrospray ionization of an aerosol of serine in methanol results in a mass spectrum with a prominent ion peak of 841 corresponding to the Ser_{8}+H^{+} cation. The smaller and larger clusters are virtually absent in the spectrum and therefore the number 8 is called a magic number. The same octamer ions are also produced by rapid evaporation of a serine solution on a hot (200–250 °C) metal surface or by sublimation of solid serine. After production, detection again is by mass-spectroscopic means. For the discussion of homochirality, these laboratory production methods are designed to mimic prebiotic conditions.

The cluster is not only unusually stable but also unusual because the clusters have a strong homochiral preference. A racemic serine solution produces a minimum amount of cluster and with solutions of both enantiomers a maximum amount is formed of both homochiral D-Ser_{8} and L-Ser_{8}. In another experiment cluster formation of a racemic mixture with deuterium enriched L-serine results in a product distribution with hardly any 50/50 D/L clusters but a preference for either D or L enantioenriched clusters.

A model for chiral amplification is proposed whereby enantioenriched clusters are formed from a non-racemic mixture already enriched by L-serine as a result of a mirror-symmetry breaking process. Cluster formation is followed by isolation and on subsequent dissociation of the cluster a serene solution forms with a higher concentration of L-serine than in the original mixture. A cycle can be maintained in which each turn results in an incremental enrichment in L-serine. Many such cycles eventually result in enantiopure L-serine. This model has been experimentally verified.

Chiral transmission is assumed to take place through so-called substitution reactions of serine clusters. In these reactions, a serine monomer in a cluster can be replaced by another small biologically relevant molecule. For instance Ser_{8} reacts with glucose (Glc) to the Ser_{6} + Glc_{3} + Na^{+} cluster. Moreover, the cluster of synthetic L-glucose with Ser_{8} is less abundant than that with the biological D-glucose.

== See also ==
- Other magic numbers in chemistry: methane clathrate, Magic angle spinning
- Other stable clusters in: aluminium superatoms
