= Cefclidin =

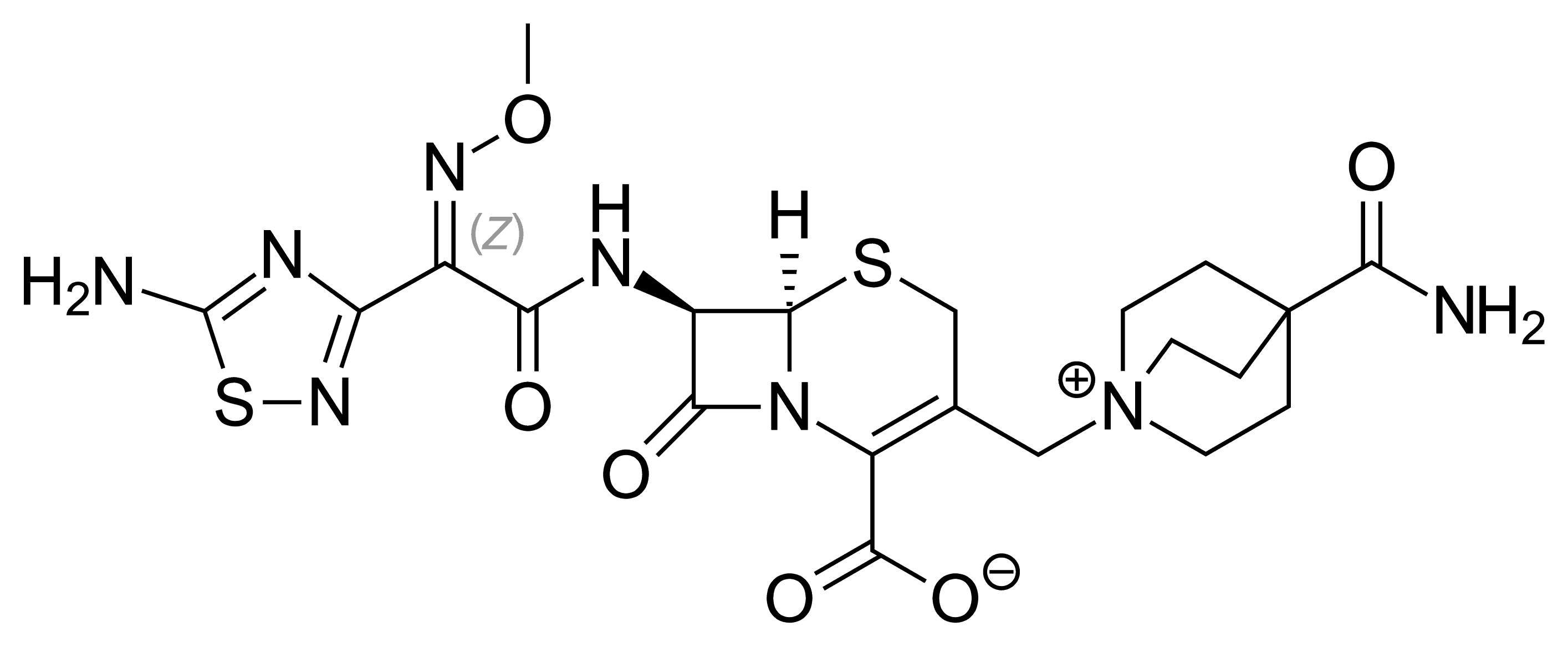

Names
- IUPAC name (6R,7R)-7-[[(2Z)-2-(5-Amino-1,2,4-thiadiazol-3-yl)-2-methoxyiminoacetyl]amino]-3-[(4-carbamoyl-1-azoniabicyclo[2.2.2]octan-1-yl)methyl]-8-oxo-5-thia-1-azabicyclo[4.2.0]oct-2-ene-2-carboxylate
- Other names Antibiotic E 1040; Cefclidine; Cefaclidine

Identifiers
CAS Number	105239-91-6
3D model (JSmol)	Interactive image
ChEMBL	ChEMBL1614665
ChemSpider	5020608
PubChem CID	6537446
UNII	78963CJ0OG
CompTox Dashboard (EPA)	DTXSID80147023
- InChI: InChI=1S/C21H26N8O6S2/c1-35-26-11(14-25-20(23)37-27-14)15(30)24-12-16(31)28-13(18(32)33)10(9-36-17(12)28)8-29-5-2-21(3-6-29,4-7-29)19(22)34/h12,17H,2-9H2,1H3,(H5-,22,23,24,25,27,30,32,33,34)/b26-11-/t12-,17-,21?,29?/m1/s1 Key: JUVHVMCKLDZLGN-TVNFHGJBSA-N; InChI=1/C21H26N8O6S2/c1-35-26-11(14-25-20(23)37-27-14)15(30)24-12-16(31)28-13(18(32)33)10(9-36-17(12)28)8-29-5-2-21(3-6-29,4-7-29)19(22)34/h12,17H,2-9H2,1H3,(H5-,22,23,24,25,27,30,32,33,34)/b26-11-/t12-,17-,21?,29?/m1/s1 Key: JUVHVMCKLDZLGN-TVNFHGJBBE
- SMILES: O=C2N1/C(=C(\CS[C@@H]1[C@@H]2NC(=O)C(=N\OC)/c3nc(sn3)N)C[N+]45CCC(C(=O)N)(CC4)CC5)C([O-])=O

Properties
Chemical formula	C_{21}H_{26}N_{8}O_{6}S_{2}
Molar mass	550.61 g·mol^{−1}
- Except where otherwise noted, data are given for materials in their standard state (at 25 °C [77 °F], 100 kPa). verify (what is ?) Infobox references

Cefclidin (also known as cefclidin, cefaclidine, or E1040) is a fourth-generation cephalosporin antibiotic.
