= Cefozopran =

Chemical compound

Clinical data
- AHFS/Drugs.com: International Drug Names
- ATC code: J01DE03 (WHO)

Identifiers
- IUPAC name: (6R,7R)-7-[[(2Z)-2-(5-amino-1,2,4-thiadiazol-3-yl)- 2-methoxyiminoacetyl]amino]-3-(imidazo[2,3-f]pyridazin- 4-ium-1-ylmethyl)-8-oxo-5-thia-1-azabicyclo[4.2.0] oct-2-ene-2-carboxylate
- CAS Number: 113359-04-9
- PubChem CID: 9571080
- ChemSpider: 7845546
- UNII: 1LG87K28LW
- KEGG: D01052
- ChEMBL: ChEMBL1276663
- CompTox Dashboard (EPA): DTXSID701025943
- ECHA InfoCard: 100.107.680

Chemical and physical data
- Formula: C_{19}H_{17}N_{9}O_{5}S_{2}
- Molar mass: 515.52 g·mol^{−1}
- 3D model (JSmol): Interactive image
- SMILES: O=C2N1/C(=C(\CS[C@@H]1[C@@H]2NC(=O)C(=N\OC)/c3nc(sn3)N)Cn5c4cccn[n+]4cc5)C([O-])=O
- InChI: InChI=1S/C19H17N9O5S2/c1-33-24-11(14-23-19(20)35-25-14)15(29)22-12-16(30)28-13(18(31)32)9(8-34-17(12)28)7-26-5-6-27-10(26)3-2-4-21-27/h2-6,12,17H,7-8H2,1H3,(H3-,20,22,23,25,29,31,32)/b24-11-/t12-,17-/m1/s1; Key:QDUIJCOKQCCXQY-WHJQOFBOSA-N

Cefozopran (INN) is a fourth-generation cephalosporin.

== Spectrum of bacterial susceptibility and resistance ==
Most of the strains of Stenotrophomonas maltophilia have developed resistance toward cefozopran.
