= Amthamine =

Names
- IUPAC name 5-(2-Aminoethyl)-4-methyl-1,3-thiazol-2-amine
- Other names 5-(2-Aminoethyl)-4-methyl-2-thiazolamine; 2-Amino-5-(2-aminoethyl)-4-methylthiazole

Identifiers
CAS Number	142437-67-0
3D model (JSmol)	Interactive image; Interactive image
ChEMBL	ChEMBL293762
ChemSpider	112538
IUPHAR/BPS	4025
PubChem CID	126688
UNII	N4ZJ2D98HM
CompTox Dashboard (EPA)	DTXSID80162039
- InChI: InChI=1S/C6H11N3S/c1-4-5(2-3-7)10-6(8)9-4/h2-3,7H2,1H3,(H2,8,9) Key: LHVRFUVVRXGZPV-UHFFFAOYSA-N; InChI=1/C6H11N3S/c1-4-5(2-3-7)10-6(8)9-4/h2-3,7H2,1H3,(H2,8,9) Key: LHVRFUVVRXGZPV-UHFFFAOYAV
- SMILES: CC1=C(SC(=N1)N)CCN; n1c(c(sc1N)CCN)C

Properties
Chemical formula	C_{6}H_{11}N_{3}S
Molar mass	157.236 g/mol
- Except where otherwise noted, data are given for materials in their standard state (at 25 °C [77 °F], 100 kPa). verify (what is ?) Infobox references

Amthamine is a histamine agonist selective for the H_{2} subtype. It has been used in vitro and in vivo to study gastric secretion, as well as other functions of the H_{2} receptor.
