= Cefotiam =

Chemical compound

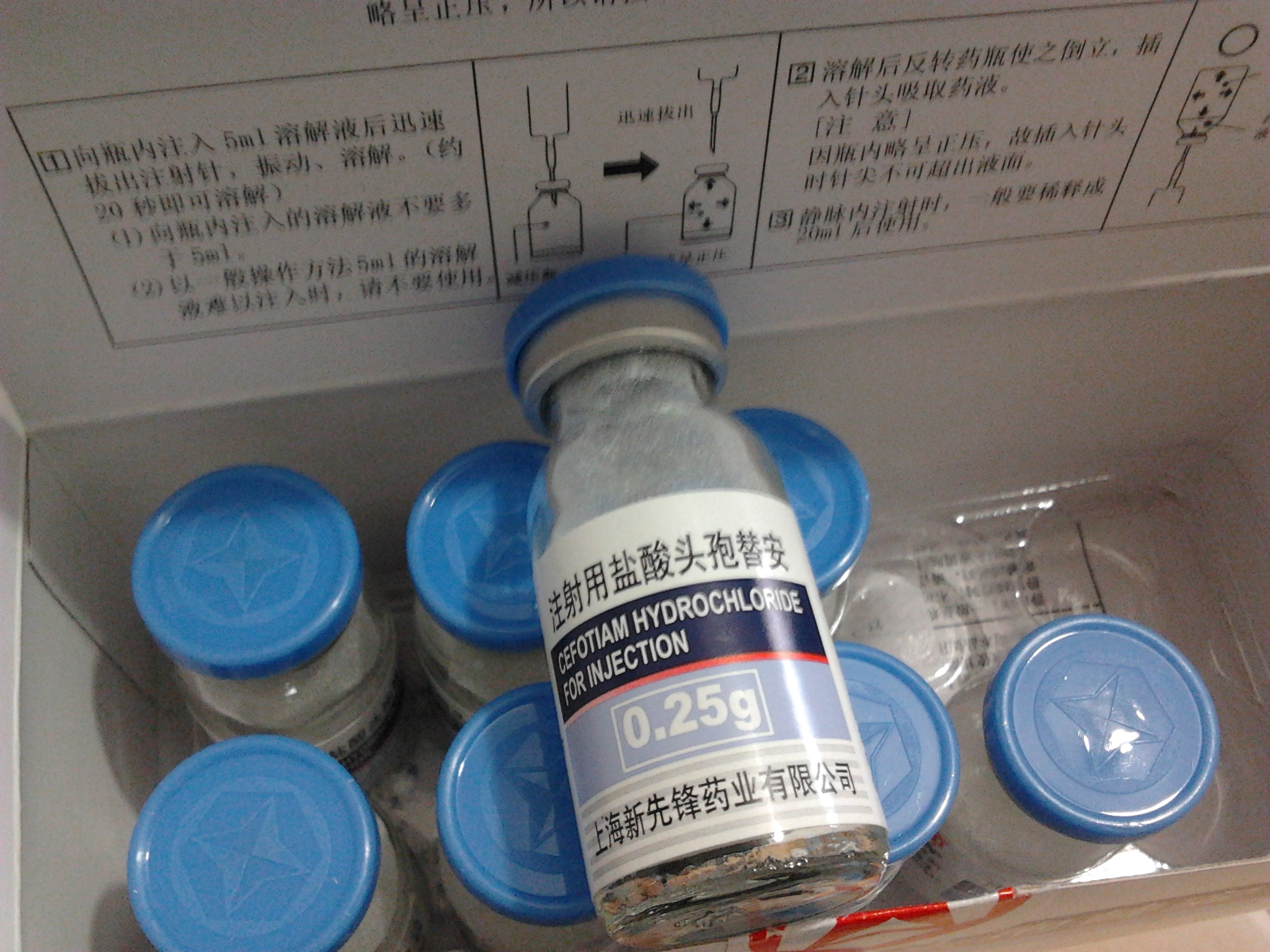

Clinical data
- Trade names: Pansporin
- AHFS/Drugs.com: International Drug Names
- Routes of administration: Intravenous, intramuscular
- ATC code: J01DC07 (WHO)

Legal status
- Legal status: In general: ℞ (Prescription only)

Pharmacokinetic data
- Bioavailability: 60% (intramuscular)
- Protein binding: 40%
- Metabolism: Nil
- Elimination half-life: Approximately 1 hour
- Excretion: Renal

Identifiers
- IUPAC name: (6R,7R)-7-{[2-(2-amino-1,3-thiazol-4-yl)acetyl] amino}-3-{[1-(2-dimethylaminoethyl)tetrazol-5-yl] sulfanylmethyl}-8-oxo-5-thia-1-azabicyclo[4.2.0] oct-2-ene-2-carboxylic acid
- CAS Number: 61622-34-2
- PubChem CID: 43708
- DrugBank: DB00229
- ChemSpider: 39831
- UNII: 91W6Z2N718
- KEGG: D07648
- ChEBI: CHEBI:355510
- ChEMBL: ChEMBL1296
- CompTox Dashboard (EPA): DTXSID6022763
- ECHA InfoCard: 100.205.922

Chemical and physical data
- Formula: C_{18}H_{23}N_{9}O_{4}S_{3}
- Molar mass: 525.62 g·mol^{−1}
- 3D model (JSmol): Interactive image
- SMILES: CN(C)CCN1N=NN=C1SCC1=C(N2[C@H](SC1)[C@H](NC(=O)CC1=CSC(N)=N1)C2=O)C(O)=O
- InChI: InChI=1S/C18H23N9O4S3/c1-25(2)3-4-26-18(22-23-24-26)34-7-9-6-32-15-12(14(29)27(15)13(9)16(30)31)21-11(28)5-10-8-33-17(19)20-10/h8,12,15H,3-7H2,1-2H3,(H2,19,20)(H,21,28)(H,30,31)/t12-,15-/m1/s1; Key:QYQDKDWGWDOFFU-IUODEOHRSA-N

Cefotiam is a parenteral third-generation cephalosporin antibiotic. It has broad-spectrum activity against Gram-positive and Gram-negative bacteria. As a beta-lactam, its bactericidal activity results from the inhibition of cell wall synthesis via affinity for penicillin-binding proteins.

It was patented in 1973 and approved for medical use in 1981.

== Medical uses ==
This drug is indicated for prophylaxis for surgical infection, postoperative infections, bacterial sepsis, bone and joint infections, cholangitis, cholecystitis, peritonitis, prostatitis, pyelonephritis, respiratory tract infections, skin and soft tissue infections, cystitis, urethritis, and infections caused by susceptible organisms. It does not have activity against Pseudomonas aeruginosa.

=== Dosage ===
For adults, the dose is up to 6 grams daily by intravenous or intramuscular route in divided doses according to the severity of infection. In patients with renal impairment a dose reduction may be needed.

=== Spectrum of bacterial susceptibility ===
Cefotiam has a broad spectrum of activity and has been used to treat infections caused by several enteric bacteria and bacteria responsible for causing skin infections. The following represents MIC susceptibility data for a few medically significant bacteria.

- Bacteroides fragilis: - 16 - >128 μg/ml
- Clostridioides difficile: >128 μg/ml
- Staphylococcus aureus: 0.25 - 32 μg/ml

== Adverse effects ==
Side effects include nausea and vomiting, diarrhoea, hypersensitivity reactions, nephrotoxicity, convulsions, CNS toxicity, hepatic dysfunction, haematologic disorders, pain at injection site, thrombophlebitis, pseudomembranous colitis, and superinfection with prolonged use.

== Mechanism of action ==
Cefotiam inhibits the final cross-linking stage of peptidoglycan production, thus inhibiting bacterial cell wall synthesis. It has similar or less activity against Gram-positive staphylococci and streptococci, but is resistant to some beta-lactamases produced by Gram-negative bacteria. It is more active against many of the Enterobacteriaceae including Enterobacter, E. coli, Klebsiella, Salmonella and indole-positive Proteus species.

In clinical use, high concentrations of cefotiam are observed in several tissues (kidney, heart, ear, prostate, and genital tract), as well as in fluids and secretions (bile, ascitic fluid).
