= Cefdinir =

Chemical compound

Clinical data
- Pronunciation: SEF-di-nir
- Trade names: Cefzon, Omnicef, others
- AHFS/Drugs.com: Monograph
- MedlinePlus: a698001
- License data: US DailyMed: Cefdinir
- Routes of administration: By mouth
- ATC code: J01DD15 (WHO)

Legal status
- Legal status: US: ℞-only

Pharmacokinetic data
- Bioavailability: 16% to 21% (dose-dependent)
- Protein binding: 60% to 70%
- Metabolism: Negligible
- Elimination half-life: 1.7 ± 0.6 hours
- Excretion: Kidney

Identifiers
- IUPAC name: 8-[2-(2-amino-1,3-thiazol-4-yl)-1-hydroxy-2-nitroso- ethenyl]amino-4-ethenyl-7-oxo-2-thia-6- azabicyclo[4.2.0]oct-4-ene-5-carboxylic acid
- CAS Number: 91832-40-5
- PubChem CID: 6915944
- DrugBank: DB00535
- ChemSpider: 5291705
- UNII: CI0FAO63WC
- KEGG: D00917
- ChEBI: CHEBI:3485
- ChEMBL: ChEMBL927
- CompTox Dashboard (EPA): DTXSID8046084
- ECHA InfoCard: 100.171.145

Chemical and physical data
- Formula: C_{14}H_{13}N_{5}O_{5}S_{2}
- Molar mass: 395.41 g·mol^{−1}
- 3D model (JSmol): Interactive image
- Melting point: 170 °C (338 °F) (dec.)
- SMILES: O=C2N1/C(=C(/C=C)CS[C@@H]1[C@@H]2NC(=O)C(=N\O)/c3nc(sc3)N)C(=O)O
- InChI: InChI=1S/C14H13N5O5S2/c1-2-5-3-25-12-8(11(21)19(12)9(5)13(22)23)17-10(20)7(18-24)6-4-26-14(15)16-6/h2,4,8,12,24H,1,3H2,(H2,15,16)(H,17,20)(H,22,23)/b18-7-/t8-,12-/m1/s1; Key:RTXOFQZKPXMALH-GHXIOONMSA-N

Cefdinir, sold under the brand name Omnicef among others, is an antibiotic used to treat bacterial infections including bacterial pneumonia, other respiratory tract infections, otitis media, strep throat, and cellulitis. It may also be used as an alternative antibiotic for those with a severe penicillin allergy. It is taken by mouth.

Common side effects include diarrhea, nausea, and a skin rash. Serious side effects may include Clostridioides difficile infection, anaphylaxis, and Stevens–Johnson syndrome. Use in pregnancy and breastfeeding is believed to be safe but has not been well studied.

It is a third-generation cephalosporin antibiotic and works by interfering with a bacteria's ability to make a cell wall, resulting in its death.

== Medical uses ==
Therapeutic uses of cefdinir include otitis media, soft tissue infections, and respiratory tract infections including sinusitis, strep throat (for penicillin-allergic patients), community-acquired pneumonia, and acute exacerbations of bronchitis.

=== Susceptible organisms ===
Cefdinir is a bactericidal antibiotic of the cephalosporin class of antibiotics. It can be used to treat infections caused by several Gram-negative and Gram-positive bacteria.

=== Bacterial susceptibility and resistance ===
Cefdinir is a broad-spectrum antibiotic and has been used to treat infections of the respiratory tract including pneumonia, sinusitis, and bronchitis. The following represents MIC susceptibility data for a few medically significant microorganisms.

- Haemophilus influenzae: 0.05 - 4 μg/ml
- Streptococcus pneumoniae: 0.006 - 64 μg/ml
- Streptococcus pyogenes: ≤0.004 - 2 μg/ml

=== Available forms ===
Cefdinir is administered orally. It is available as capsules and a suspension. The dosage, schedule, and duration of therapy vary according to the type of infection.

It is available under several brand names and as a generic medication.

== Side effects ==
Side effects of cefdinir include diarrhea, vaginal infections or inflammation, nausea, headache, and abdominal pain."

It is also one of the medications that can cause toxic epidermal necrolysis or Stevens–Johnson syndrome.

The pediatric version of cefdinir can bind to iron in the digestive tract; in rare cases, this causes rust or red discoloration of the stool. Blood typically appears dark brown or black in stool, and testing may confirm which is present. If the reddish stool is accompanied by abdominal pain, weight loss, diarrhea, etc., a Clostridioides difficile infection caused by the antibiotic could be signified.

== Synthesis ==

Acylation at the primary amine of the cephalosporin intermediate (1) with 4-bromo-3-oxobutanoyl bromide (2) gives the amide (3). The active methylene group in that compound is then nitrosated with sodium nitrite; the initial product spontaneously tautomerizes to afford the oxime (4). The bromoketone functional group reacts with thiourea in the penultimate step, forming the thiazole ring of cefdinir, which is the product after removal of the benzhydryl ester protecting group with trifluoroacetic acid.

== Society and culture ==
=== Economics ===
Cefdinir was patented in 1979 and first approved for medical use in 1991.

Warner-Lambert licensed the drug for marketing in the US from Fujisawa. Abbott later obtained U.S. marketing rights to cefdinir in December 1998 through an agreement with Warner-Lambert Company. It was approved by the US FDA on 4 December 1997. It is available in US as Omnicef by Abbott Laboratories and in India as Cednir by Abbott, Kefnir by Glenmark, Cefdair by Xalra Pharma and Cefdiel by Ranbaxy.

As of 2008, cefdinir was the highest-selling cephalosporin antibiotic in the United States, with more than $585 million in retail sales of its generic versions.

In 2023, it was the 165th most commonly prescribed medication in the United States, with more than 3 million prescriptions.
