= 2-Aminothiazole =

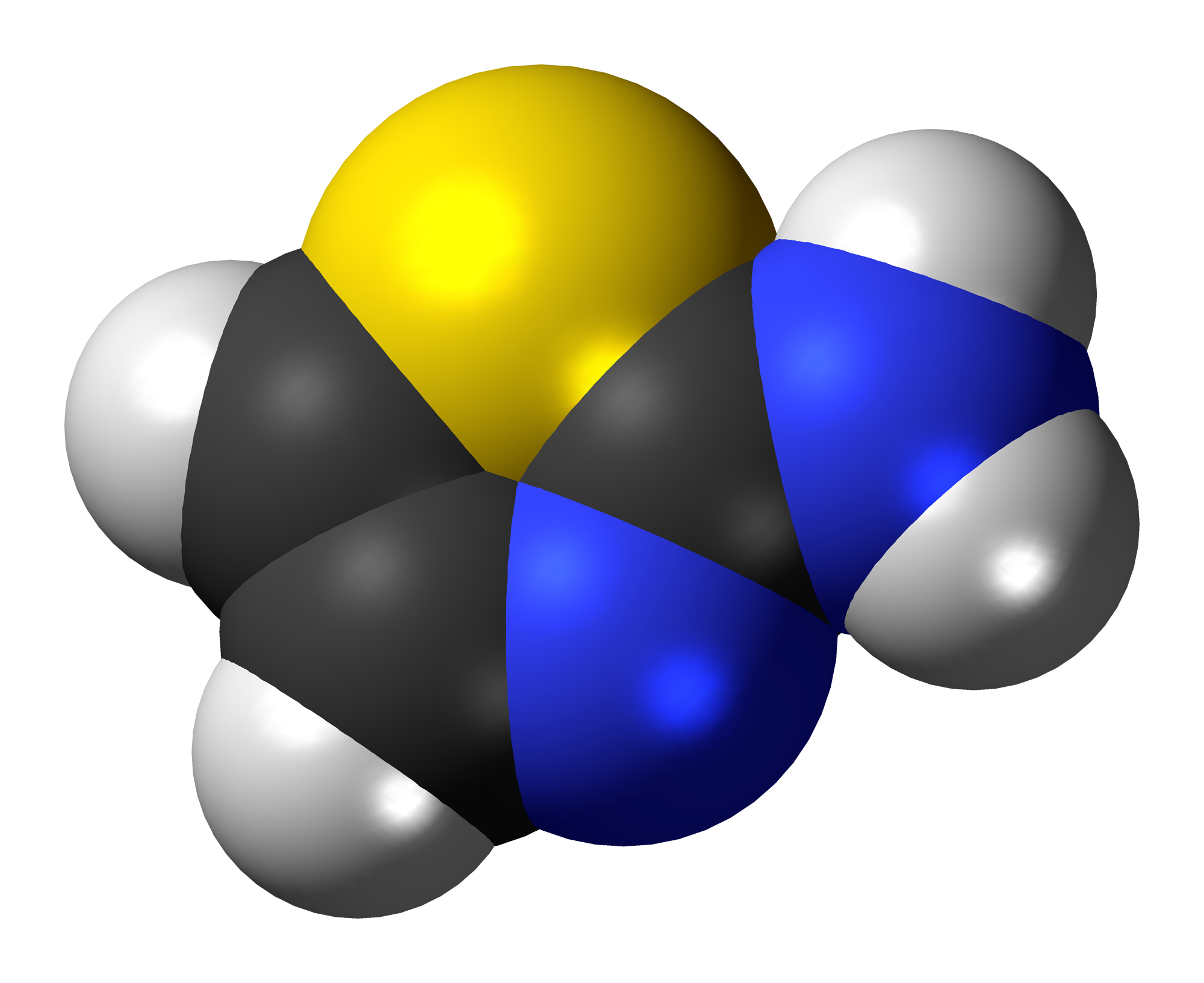

Names
- Preferred IUPAC name 1,3-Thiazol-2-amine
- Other names 2-Thiazolamine, Aminothiazole, 2-Thiazylamine, Basedol, 2-Thiazolylamine, 4-Thiazolin-2-onimine, 2-Amino-1,3-thiazole, Abadole

Identifiers
CAS Number	96-50-4
3D model (JSmol)	Interactive image
ChEBI	CHEBI:40782
ChEMBL	ChEMBL344760
ChemSpider	2070
ECHA InfoCard	100.002.284
EC Number	202-511-6
KEGG	D02479
PubChem CID	2155
UNII	5K8WKN668K
CompTox Dashboard (EPA)	DTXSID5024508
- InChI: InChI=1S/C3H4N2S/c4-3-5-1-2-6-3/h1-2H,(H2,4,5) Key: RAIPHJJURHTUIC-UHFFFAOYSA-N; InChI=1/C3H4N2S/c4-3-5-1-2-6-3/h1-2H,(H2,4,5) Key: RAIPHJJURHTUIC-UHFFFAOYAZ
- SMILES: c1csc(n1)N

Properties
Chemical formula	C_{3}H_{4}N_{2}S
Molar mass	100.14 g·mol^{−1}
Appearance	Light yellow crystals
Melting point	86 to 89 °C (187 to 192 °F; 359 to 362 K)
Boiling point	117 °C (243 °F; 390 K) (20 hPa)
Solubility in water	100 g/L (20 °C)
Magnetic susceptibility (χ)	−56.0·10^{−6} cm^{3}/mol

Hazards
- GHS labelling
Pictograms	(GHS07: Exclamation mark)
Signal word	Warning
Hazard statements	H302, H319
Precautionary statements	P264, P264+P265, P270, P280, P301+P317, P305+P351+P338, P330, P337+P317, P501
NFPA 704 (fire diamond)	2 0 0
Autoignition temperature	600 °C (1,112 °F; 873 K)
- Except where otherwise noted, data are given for materials in their standard state (at 25 °C [77 °F], 100 kPa). verify (what is ?) Infobox references

2-Aminothiazole is a heterocyclic amine featuring a thiazole core. It can also be considered a cyclic isothiourea. It possesses an odor similar to pyridine and is soluble in water, alcohols and diethyl ether. 2-Aminothiazole itself is mainly of academic interest, with few exceptions. It is a precursor to a sulfathiazole ("sulfa drugs"). 2-Aminothiazole can be used as a thyroid inhibitor in the treatment of hyperthyroidism.

2-Aminothiazole is prepared from paraldehyde, thiourea, and sulfuryl chloride.

== 2-Aminothiazoles ==
Like the parent, 2-aminothiazoles are often produced by the condensation of thiourea and an alpha-halo ketone.

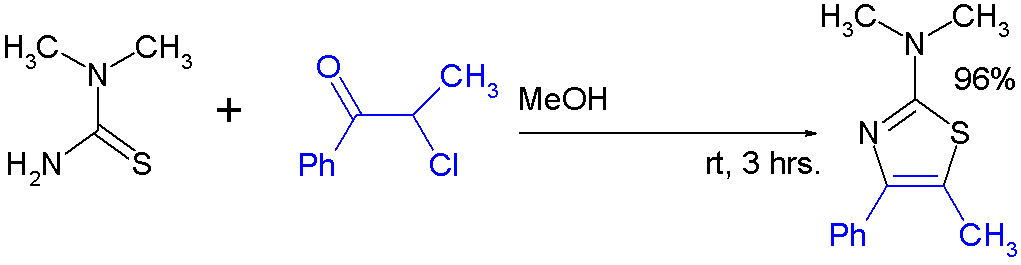
Hantsch Thiazole Synthesis

In an adaptation of the Robinson-Gabriel synthesis, a 2-acylamino-ketone reacts with phosphorus pentasulfide.

== Applications ==
Synthetic aminothiazoles - compounds containing the parent 2-aminothiazole as a subunit - are used in medicinal chemistry. Some examples are abafungin, acotiamide, amiphenazole, amthamine, avatrombopag, aztreonam, cefepime, cefixime, ceftizoxime, ceftiofur, ceftibuten, cefpirome, famotidine, meloxicam, and pramipexole.

See a related compound called 2-Amino-2-thiazoline [1779-81-3].
