= 1,3-Dihydroimidazol-2-one =

Names
- Other names 2-Hydroxyimidazole

Identifiers
CAS Number	5918-93-4
3D model (JSmol)	Interactive image
Beilstein Reference	105774
ChEBI	CHEBI:51022
ChemSpider	20850
ECHA InfoCard	100.302.640
EC Number	852-506-3
KEGG	C20382
PubChem CID	22208
UNII	C658O375NL
CompTox Dashboard (EPA)	DTXSID40207910
- InChI: InChI=1S/C3H4N2O/c6-3-4-1-2-5-3/h1-2H,(H2,4,5,6) Key: AICIYIDUYNFPRY-UHFFFAOYSA-N
- SMILES: C1=CNC(=O)N1

Properties
Chemical formula	C_{3}H_{4}N_{2}O
Molar mass	84.078 g·mol^{−1}

Hazards
- GHS labelling
Pictograms	(GHS05: Corrosive) (GHS07: Exclamation mark) (GHS08: Health hazard)
Signal word	Danger
Hazard statements	H302, H314, H315, H319, H335, H360D
Precautionary statements	P203, P260, P264, P264+P265, P270, P271, P280, P301+P317, P301+P330+P331, P302+P352, P302+P361+P354, P304+P340, P305+P351+P338, P305+P354+P338, P316, P317, P318, P319, P321, P330, P332+P317, P337+P317, P362+P364, P363, P403+P233, P405, P501
- Except where otherwise noted, data are given for materials in their standard state (at 25 °C [77 °F], 100 kPa). Infobox references

1,3-Dihydroimidazol-2-one is a chemical compound belonging to the group of unsaturated compounds nitrogen heterocycles. It is classified as a lactam and is a derivative of imidazoline and urea.

== Representation ==
1,3-Dihydroimidazol-2-one (2) is obtained by reduction of hydantoin (1) with diisobutylaluminum hydride (DIBAH) in tetrahydrofuran.

The Schwartz reagent can be used as an alternative reducing agent.

Another synthetic route is based on 2,2-diethoxyethylamine (1). Reaction with potassium cyanate yields 2,2-diethoxyethylurea (2), which undergoes cyclization under acidic conditions with sulfuric acid to form 1,3-dihydroimidazol-2-one (3).

== Properties ==
Several tautomeric forms of 1,3-dihydroimidazol-2-one are possible due to keto-enol tautomerism. In addition to 1,3-dihydroimidazol-2-one (1), these include 1H-imidazol-2-ol (2), 4H-imidazol-2-ol (3), and 1,5-dihydroimidazol-2-one (4). The preferred tautomer is 1,3-dihydroimidazol-2-one.

== Use ==
In organic synthesis, 1,3-dihydroimidazol-2-one serves as a versatile building block for the preparation of substituted vicinal diamines or compounds featuring a cyclic urea structure.

1,3-Dihydroimidazol-2-one undergoes [2+2]-cycloadditions, for which the diacetylated derivative is typically employed due to solubility considerations. This reaction represents, for example, a key step in a total synthesis of biotin (5). Upon treatment with acetic anhydride, 1,3-dihydroimidazol-2-one (1) is first converted into 1,3-diacetyl-1,3-dihydroimidazol-2-one (2). A subsequent photochemical reaction with 3,4-dihydro-2-methoxy-2H-pyran (3) yields the tricyclic cyclobutane derivative 4, which can be transformed into biotin through several subsequent steps.
