= 2-Aminooxazole =

Chemical compound

Names
- Preferred IUPAC name 1,3-Oxazol-2-amine
- Other names: 2-Oxazolamine; imino oxazole; Oxazole-2-amine; oxazolyl amine

Identifiers
CAS Number	4570-45-0
3D model (JSmol)	Interactive image
ChemSpider	485518
ECHA InfoCard	100.128.287
EC Number	610-269-1
MeSH	2-aminooxazole
PubChem CID	558521
CompTox Dashboard (EPA)	DTXSID00339766
- InChI: InChI=1S/C3H4N2O/c4-3-5-1-2-6-3/h1-2H,(H2,4,5) InChIKey = ACTKAGSPIFDCMF-UHFFFAOYSA-N
- SMILES: C1=COC(=N1)N

Properties
Chemical formula	C_{3}H_{4}N_{2}O
Molar mass	84.08 g/mol
Appearance	White solid (at 97% purity)
Density	1.2±0.1 g/cm3
Melting point	90-95 °C
Boiling point	186.7±23.0 °C
Vapor pressure	0.7±0.4 mmHg

Hazards
- GHS labelling
Pictograms	(GHS07: Exclamation mark)
Signal word	Warning
Hazard statements	H315, H319, H335
Precautionary statements	P261, P264, P264+P265, P271, P280, P302+P352, P304+P340, P305+P351+P338, P319, P321, P332+P317, P337+P317, P362+P364, P403+P233, P405, P501
Flash point	66.7±22.6 °C
- Except where otherwise noted, data are given for materials in their standard state (at 25 °C [77 °F], 100 kPa). Infobox references

2-Aminooxazole is a heterocyclic organic compound, belonging to the class of oxazoles. It is a five-membered ring structure containing one oxygen and two nitrogen atoms.

== Properties ==
2-Aminooxazole contains a primary amine group which can participate in various reactions like protonation, acylation, or alkylation. The oxazole ring can also show reactions like ring expansion, electrophilic substitution, etc. and also contributes aromatic character and stability to the molecule.

== Applications ==
2-Aminooxazole possesses antimicrobial properties against various fungal and bacterial strains especially against Tuberculosis-causing Mycobacterium tuberculosis.

The amine group of 2-Aminooxazole can potentially link with different molecules, making it a potential candidate for drug synthesis in antitubercular medicinal chemistry.

2-Aminooxazole has also been hypothesised to have played a role in chemical evolution as a precursor of RNA nucleotides.

== See also ==
- Oxazoles
- 2-Aminothiazole
