= Bovine serum albumin =

Serum albumin protein derived from cows

albumin
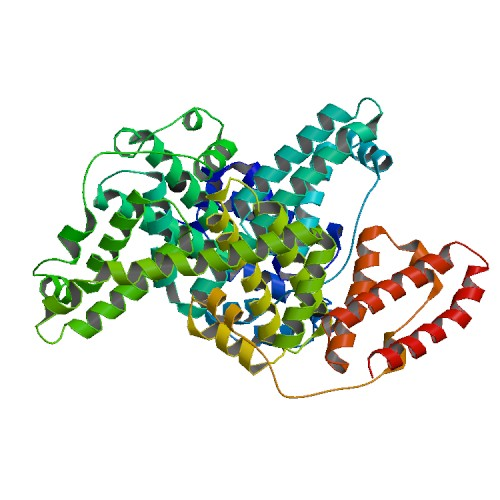

Identifiers
- Organism: Bos taurus (domestic cow)
- Symbol: ALB
- Entrez: 280717
- Orthologs: NCBI: entry; OMA: entry
- RefSeq (mRNA): NM_180992
- RefSeq (Prot): NP_851335
- UniProt: P02769

Other data
- Chromosome: 6: 91.54 - 91.57 Mb
Search for
- Structures: Swiss-model
- Domains: InterPro

Bovine serum albumin (BSA or "Bovine Fraction V") is a serum albumin protein derived from cows. It is often used as a protein concentration standard in lab experiments.

The nickname "Fraction V" refers to albumin being the fifth fraction of the original Edwin Cohn purification methodology that made use of differential solubility characteristics of plasma proteins. By manipulating solvent concentrations, pH, salt levels, and temperature, Cohn was able to pull out successive "fractions" of blood plasma. The process was first commercialized with human albumin for medical use and later adopted for production of BSA.

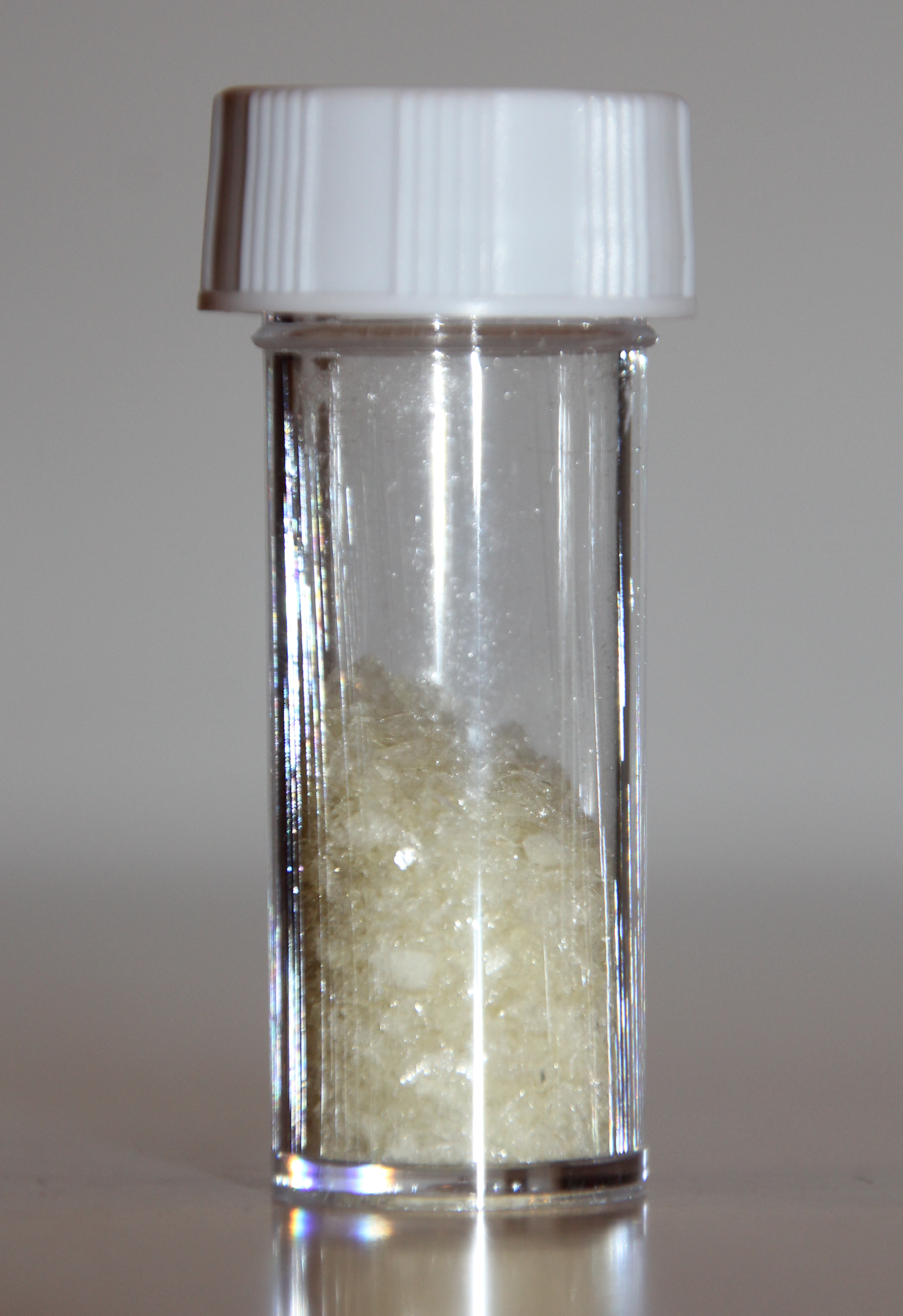
Lyophilized bovine serum albumin

== Properties ==
The full-length BSA precursor polypeptide is 607 amino acids (AAs) in length. An N-terminal 18-residue signal peptide is cut off from the precursor protein upon secretion, hence the initial protein product contains 589 amino acid residues. An additional six amino acids are cleaved to yield the mature BSA protein that contains 583 amino acids.

BSA has three homologous but structurally different domains. The domains, named I, II, and III, are broken down into two sub-domains, A and B.

Peptide	Position	Length (AAs)	MW Da
Full length precursor	1 – 607	607	69,324
Signal peptide	1 – 18	18	2,107
Propeptide	19 – 24	6	478
Mature protein	25 – 607	583	66,463

Physical properties of BSA:

- Number of amino acid residues: 583
- Molecular weight: 66,463 Da (= 66.5 kDa)
- isoelectric point in water at 25 °C: 4.7
- Extinction coefficient of 43,824 M^{−1}cm^{−1} at 279 nm
- Dimensions: 140 × 40 × 40 Å (prolate ellipsoid where a = b < c)
- pH of 1% Solution: 5.2-7
- Optical Rotation: [α]_{259}: -61°; [α]_{264}: -63°
- Stokes Radius (r_{s}): 3.48 nm
- Sedimentation constant, S_{20,W} × 10^{13}: 4.5 (monomer), 6.7 (dimer)
- Diffusion constant, D_{20,W} × 10^{−7} cm^{2}/s: 5.9
- Partial specific volume, V_{20}: 0.733
- Intrinsic viscosity, η: 0.0413
- Frictional ratio, f/f0: 1.30
- Refractive index increment (578 nm) × 10^{−3}: 1.90
- Optical absorbance, A^{279 nm}_{1 g/L}: 0.667
- ε_{280} = 43.824 mM^{−1} cm^{−1}
- Mean residue rotation, [m']_{233}: 8443
- Mean residue ellipticity: 21.1 [θ]_{209 nm}; 20.1 [θ]_{222 nm}
- Estimated a-helix, %: 54
- Estimated b-form, %: 18

== Function ==
BSA, like other serum albumins, is critical in providing oncotic pressure within capillaries, transporting fatty acids, bilirubin, minerals and hormones, and functioning as both an anticoagulant and an antioxidant. There are approximately six different long-chain fatty acid binding sites on the protein, the three strongest of which are located one per each domain. BSA can also bind other substances such as salicylate, sulfonamides, bilirubin, and other drugs, which bind to “site 1” in subdomain IIA, while tryptophan, thyroxine, octanoate and other drugs that are aromatic in nature bind to “site 2” in subdomain IIIA.

== Applications ==
BSA is often used as a model for other serum albumin proteins, especially human serum albumin, to which it is 76% structurally homologous.

BSA has numerous biochemical applications including ELISAs (Enzyme-Linked Immunosorbent Assay), immunoblots, and immunohistochemistry. Because BSA is a small, stable, moderately non-reactive protein, it is often used as a blocker in immunohistochemistry. During immunohistochemistry, which is the process that uses antibodies to identify antigens in cells, tissue sections are often incubated with BSA blockers to bind nonspecific binding sites. This binding of BSA to nonspecific binding sites increases the chance that the antibodies will bind only to the antigens of interest. The BSA blocker improves sensitivity by decreasing background noise as the sites are covered with the moderately non-reactive protein. During this process, minimization of nonspecific binding of antibodies is essential in order to acquire the highest signal to noise ratio. BSA is also used as a nutrient in cell and microbial culture. In restriction digests, BSA is used to stabilize some enzymes during the digestion of DNA and to prevent adhesion of the enzyme to reaction tubes, pipette tips, and other vessels. This protein does not affect other enzymes that do not need it for stabilization. BSA is also commonly used to determine the quantity of other proteins, by comparing an unknown quantity of protein to known amounts of BSA (see Bradford protein assay). BSA is used because of its ability to increase signal in assays, its lack of effect in many biochemical reactions, and its low cost, since large quantities of it can be readily purified from bovine blood, a byproduct of the cattle industry. Another use for BSA is that it can be used to temporarily isolate substances that are blocking the activity of the enzyme that is needed, thus impeding polymerase chain reaction (PCR). BSA has been widely used as a template to synthesize nanostructures and determining the toxic or beneficial effects of metal ions and their complexes.

BSA is also the main constituent of fetal bovine serum, a common cell culture medium.

== See also ==
- Acceptable daily intake
- Protein allergy
- Human serum albumin
- Serum albumin
