= Cohn process =

Steps to extract albumen from blood plasma

The Cohn process, developed by Edwin J. Cohn, is a series of purification steps with the purpose of extracting albumin from blood plasma. The process is based on the differential solubility of albumin and other plasma proteins based on pH, ethanol concentration, temperature, ionic strength, and protein concentration. Albumin has the highest solubility and lowest isoelectric point of all the major plasma proteins. This makes it the final product to be precipitated, or separated from its solution in a solid form. Albumin was an excellent substitute for human plasma in World War Two. When administered to wounded soldiers or other patients with blood loss, it helped expand the volume of blood and led to speedier recovery. Cohn's method was gentle enough that isolated albumin protein retained its biological activity.

== Process details ==
During the operations, the ethanol concentration change from zero initially to 40%. The pH decreases from neutral at 7 to more acidic at 4.8 over the course of the fractionation. The temperature starts at room temperature and decreases to −5 degrees Celsius. Initially, the blood is frozen. There are five major fractions. Each fraction ends with a specific precipitate. These precipitates are the separate fractions.

Fractions I, II, and III are precipitated out at earlier stages. The conditions of the earlier stages are 8% ethanol, pH 7.2, −3 °C, and 5.1% protein for Fraction I; 25% ethanol, pH of 6.9, −5 °C, and 3% protein. The albumin remains in the supernatant fraction during the solid/liquid separation under these conditions. Fraction IV has several unwanted proteins that need to be removed. In order to do this, the conditions are varied in order to precipitate the proteins out. The conditions to precipitate these proteins are raising the ethanol concentration from 18 to 40% and raising the pH from 5.2 to 5.8. Finally, albumin is located in fraction V. The precipitation of albumin is done by reducing the pH to 4.8, which is near the pI of the protein, and maintaining the ethanol concentration to be 40%, with a protein concentration of 1%. Thus, only 1% of the original plasma remains in the fifth fraction.

However, albumin is lost at each process stage, with roughly 20% of the albumin lost through precipitation stages before fraction V. In order to purify the albumin, there is an extraction with water, and adjustment to 10% ethanol, pH of 4.5 at −3 °C. Any precipitate formed here is done so by filtration and is an impurity. These precipitates are discarded. Reprecipitation, or repetition of the precipitation step in order to improve purity, is done so by raising ethanol concentration back to 40% from the extraction stage. The pH is 5.2 and it is conducted at −5 °C. Several variations of Cohn fraction were created to account for lower cost and higher yield. Generally, if the yield is high, the purity is lowered, to roughly 85–90%.

Fraction #:	Fraction I	Fraction II	Fraction III	Fraction IV	Fraction V
Ethanol %:	8	25	18	40	40
pH:	7.2	6.9	5.2	5.8	4.8
Temperature (°C)	−3	−5	−5	−5	−5
Protein fraction (%):	5.1	3	3	3	1

== Products other than albumin ==
Cohn was able to start the Plasma Fractionation Laboratory after he was given massive funding from the government agencies and the private pharmaceutical companies. This led to the fractionation of human plasma. Human plasma proved to have several useful components other than albumin. Human blood plasma fractionation yielded human serum albumin, serum gamma globulin, fibrinogen, thrombin, and blood group globulins. The fibrinogen and thrombin fractions were further combined during the War into additional products, including liquid fibrin sealant, solid fibrin foam and a fibrin film. Gamma globulins are found in Fractions II and III and proved to be essential in treating measles for soldiers. Gamma globulin also was useful in treatment for polio, but did not have much effect in treating mumps or scarlet fever. Most importantly, the gamma globulins were useful in modifying and preventing infectious hepatitis during the Second World War. It eventually became a treatment for children exposed to this type of hepatitis.

Liquid fibrin sealant was used in treating burn victims, including some from the attack at Pearl Harbor, to attach skin grafts with an increased success rate. It was also found helpful at re-connecting or anastomosing severed nerves. Fibrin foam and thrombin were used to control blood vessel oozing especially in liver injuries and near tumors. It also minimized bleeding from large veins as well as dealing with blood vessel malformations within the brain. Fibrin film was used to stop bleeding in various surgical applications, including neurosurgery. However, it was not useful in controlling arterial bleeding. The first fibrinogen/fibrin based product capable of stopping arterial hemorrhage was the "Fibrin Sealant Bandage" or "Hemostatic Dressing (HD)" invented by Martin MacPhee at the American Red Cross in the early 1990s, and tested in collaboration with the U.S. Army.

== Process variations ==
The Gerlough method, developed in 1955 improved process economics by reducing the consumption of ethanol. Instead of 40% in certain steps, Gerlough used 20% ethanol for precipitation. This is especially used for Fractions II and III. In addition, Gerlough combined the two fractions with IV into one step to reduce the number of fractionations required. While this method proved less expensive, it was not adopted by industry because of this combination of fractions II, III, and IV, for fear of mixing and high impurities.

The Hink method developed in 1957. This method gave higher yields through recovery of some of the plasma proteins discarded in the Fractions of IV. The improved yields, however, balanced by the lower purities obtained, within the 85% range.

The Mulford method, akin to the Hink, used the fractions II and III supernatant as the last step before finishing and heat treatment. The method combined fractions IV and V, but in this case, the albumin would not be as pure, although the yields may be higher.

Another variation was developed by Kistler and Nitschmann, to provide a purer form of albumin, even though offset by lower yields. Similar to Gerlough, the Precipitate A, which is equivalent to Cohn’s Fraction II and III, was done at a lower ethanol concentration of 19%, but the pH, in this case, was also lower to 5.85. Also similar to Gerlough and Mulford, the fraction IV was combined and precipitated at conditions of 40% ethanol, pH of 5.85, and temperature of −8 degrees C. The albumin, which is recovered in fraction V, is recovered in Precipitate C at a pH adjustment to 4.8. Similar to the Cohn Process, the albumin is purified by extraction into water followed by precipitation of the impurities at 10% ethanol, pH 4.6, and −3 degrees C. Akin to the Cohn Process, the precipitate formed here is filtered out and discarded. Then Precipitate C (fraction V) is reprecipitated at pH 5.2 and stored as a paste at −40 degrees C. This process has been more widely accepted because it separates the fractions and makes each stage independent of each other.

Precipitate:	A	B	C
Ethanol %:	19	40	40
pH:	5.85	5.85	4.8
Temperature (degs C)	−3	−8	−8

Another variation involved a heat ethanol fractionation. It was originally developed to inactivate the hepatitis virus. In this process, recovery of high yield, high purity albumin is the most important goal, while the other plasma proteins are neglected. In order to make sure the albumin does not denature in the heat, there are stabilizers such as sodium octanoate, which allow the albumin to tolerate higher temperatures for long periods. In heat ethanol, the plasma is heat treated at 68 degrees C with sodium octanoate with 9% ethanol at pH of 6.5. This results in improved albumin recovery with yields of 90%, and purities of 100%. It is not nearly as expensive as cold ethanol procedures such as the Cohn Process. One drawback is the presences of new antigens due to possible heat denaturation of the albumin. In addition, the other plasma proteins have practical uses and to neglect them would not be worth it. Finally, the expensive heat treatment vessels offset the lower cost compared to the cold ethanol format that do not need it. For these reasons, several companies haven not adopted this method even though it has the most impressive results. However, one prominent organization that uses it is the German Red Cross.

The latest variation was developed by Hao in 1979. This method is significantly simplified compared to the Cohn Process. Its goal is to create high albumin yields as long as albumin is the sole product. Through a two-stage process, impurities are precipitated directly from fractions II and III supernatant at 42% ethanol, pH 5.8, temperature −5 degrees C, 1.2% protein, and 0.09 ionic strength. Fraction V is precipitated at pH 4.8. Fractions I, II, III, and IV are coprecipitated at 40% ethanol, with pH of 5.4 to 7.0, and temperature −3 to −7 degrees C. Fraction V is then precipitated at pH 4.8 and −10 degrees C. The high yields are due to a combination of a simplified process, with lower losses due to coprecipitation, and use of filtration. Higher purities were also achieved at 98% because of the higher ethanol levels, but the yields were lowered with the high purity.

More recent methods involve the use of chromatography.

== Influences of Cohn process ==
The Cohn process was a major development in the field of blood fractionation. It has several practical uses in treating diseases such as hepatitis and polio. It was most useful during the Second World War where soldiers recovered at a faster rate because of the transfusions with albumin. The Cohn Process has been modified over the years as seen above. In addition, it has influenced other processes with the blood fractionation industry. This has led to new forms of fractionation such as chromatographic plasma fractionation in ion exchange and albumin finishing processes. In general, the Cohn Process and its variations have given a huge boost to and serve as a foundation for the fractionation industry to this day.

However, the process has not been studied well because it is archaic. Most importantly, it has never been modernized by manufacturing companies. The cold ethanol format may be too gentle to kill off certain viruses that require heat inactivation. Since this process remains unchanged for so long, several built-in inefficiencies and inconsistencies affect the economics of the process for pharmaceutical and manufacturing companies. One exception to this was the application in Scotland of continuous-flow processing instead of batch processing. This process was devised at the Protein Fractionation Centre (PFC), the plasma fractionation facility of the Scottish National Blood Transfusion Service (SNBTS). This process involved in-line monitoring and control of pH and temperature, with flow control of plasma and ethanol streams using precision gear pumps, all under computerised feedback control . As a result, Cohn Fractions I+II+III, IV and V were produced in a few hours, rather than over many days. The continuous-flow preparation of cryoprecipitate was subsequently integrated into the process upstream of Cohn Fractionation.

Nevertheless, this process still serves as a major foundation for the blood industry in general and its influence can be seen as it is referred to in the development of newer methods. Although it has its drawbacks depending on the variation, the Cohn Process’ main advantage is its practical uses and its utility within pharmacological and medical industries.
