= John Tileston Edsall =

American biochemist (1902–2002)

- Born: November 3, 1902; Philadelphia
- Died: June 12, 2002 (aged 99); Cambridge, Massachusetts
- Education: Harvard University
- Known for: Hydrophobic interaction
- Spouse: Margaret Dunham
- Children: 3 sons
- Awards: Willard Gibbs Award
- Scientific career
- Fields: Protein chemistry
- Institutions: Harvard University

John Tileston Edsall (3 November 1902 – 12 June 2002) was an American protein scientist who contributed significantly to the understanding of the hydrophobic interaction. He was an elected member of the American Academy of Arts and Sciences, the United States National Academy of Sciences, and the American Philosophical Society.

== Early life ==
Born in Philadelphia, John Edsall moved to Boston with his family at the age of 10. He graduated from Harvard University with a degree in chemistry. At Harvard he was a good friend of the physicist Robert Oppenheimer. He wrote an account of his life and career in a review.

== Protein research ==
Edsall worked with Edwin Cohn during World War II to apply protein methods to blood fractionation. Subsequently, in 1943, they published a book Proteins, Amino Acids and Peptides. This had a profound influence on the next generation of protein scientists. Long afterwards Edsall wrote an account of his interaction with Cohn.

He published numerous papers on protein chemistry, including work on myosin, fibrinogen, light scattering, measurement of tyrosine groups by ultraviolet spectroscopy, and carbonic anhydrase.

In 1944 Edsall was a founding co-editor of the journal Advances in Protein Chemistry. He was invited by the publisher Kurt Jacoby and the founding editor Tim Anson, whom he had met in 1924 in Cambridge (although they were both undergraduates at Harvard University at nearly the same time). He remained series editor up to volume 47 (1995).

From 1958 to 1967 Edsall was chief editor of the Journal of Biological Chemistry, years that Irving M. Klotz described in the following terms:

These years cover the period of the transition from a stodgy classical journal to a modern exciting one, reflecting the rise of molecular biological approaches.

At his retirement from the editorship Konrad Bloch published a tribute to him in the Journal.

He was professor at Harvard University. He inspired medical student Alexander Rich to pursue an academic career.

== Personal history ==
Edsall married Margaret Dunham of Scarsdale, NY, May 1, 1929, in Scarsdale. They had three sons: James Lawrence Dunham Edsall (known always as Lawrence), June 6, 1930 - July 8, 1978; David T. Edsall, born 1933, and Nicholas C. Edsall, born 1936. Margaret D. Edsall was born in New York, NY, June 9, 1902, and died May 19, 1987. They lived most of their married life in Cambridge, MA.
