= GADV-protein world hypothesis =

Hypothetical stage of abiogenesis

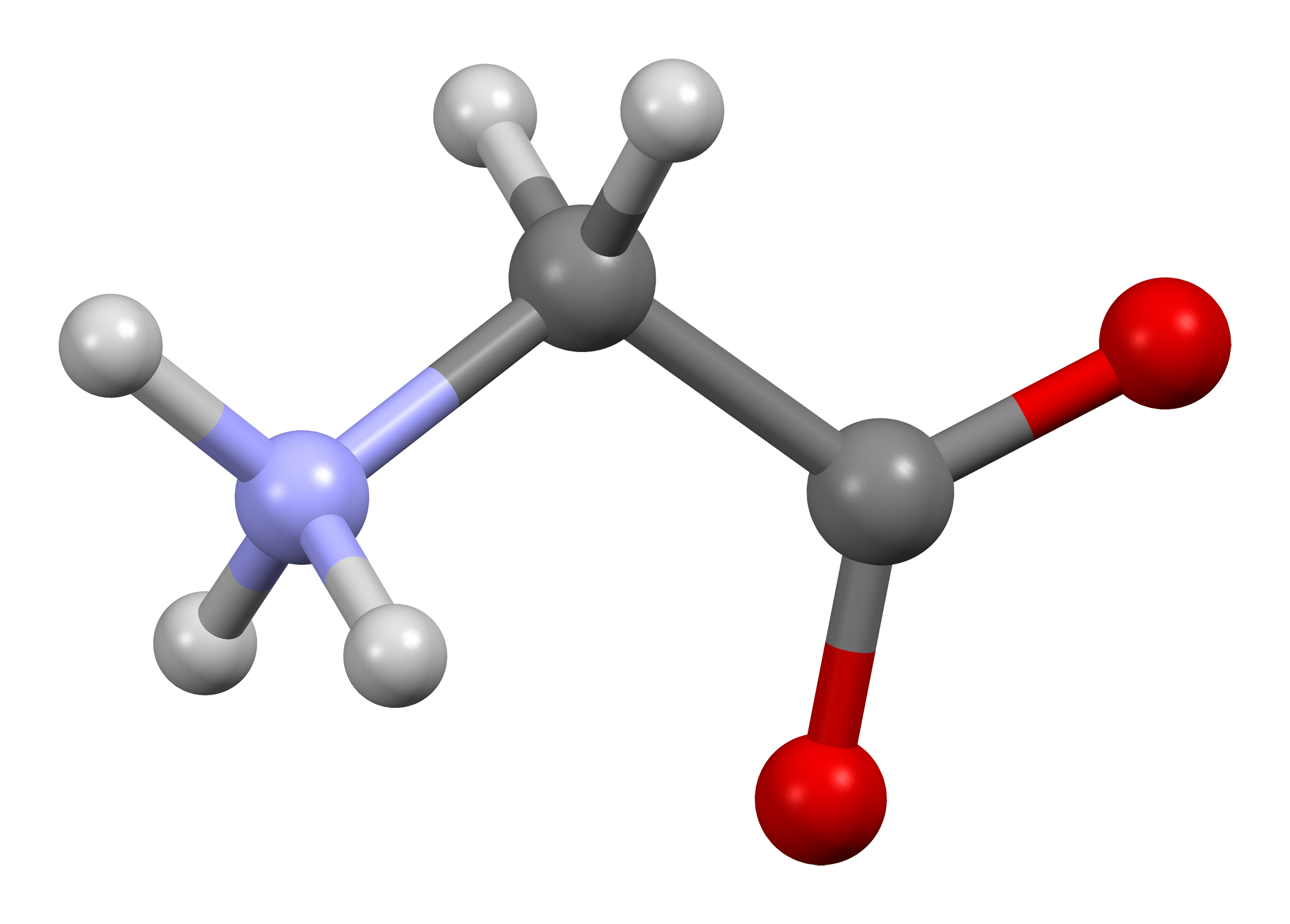
Glycine (G)

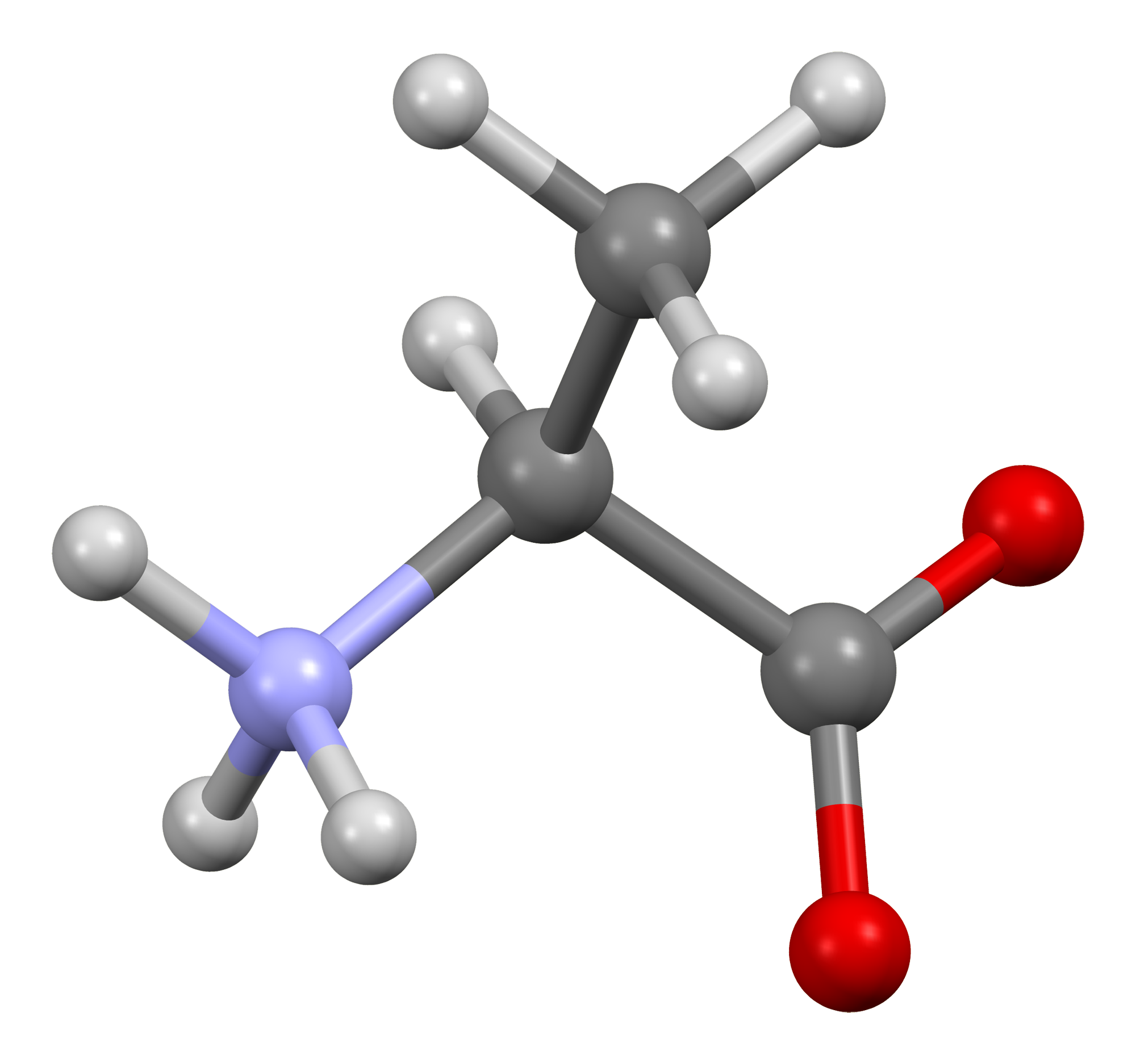
Alanine (A)

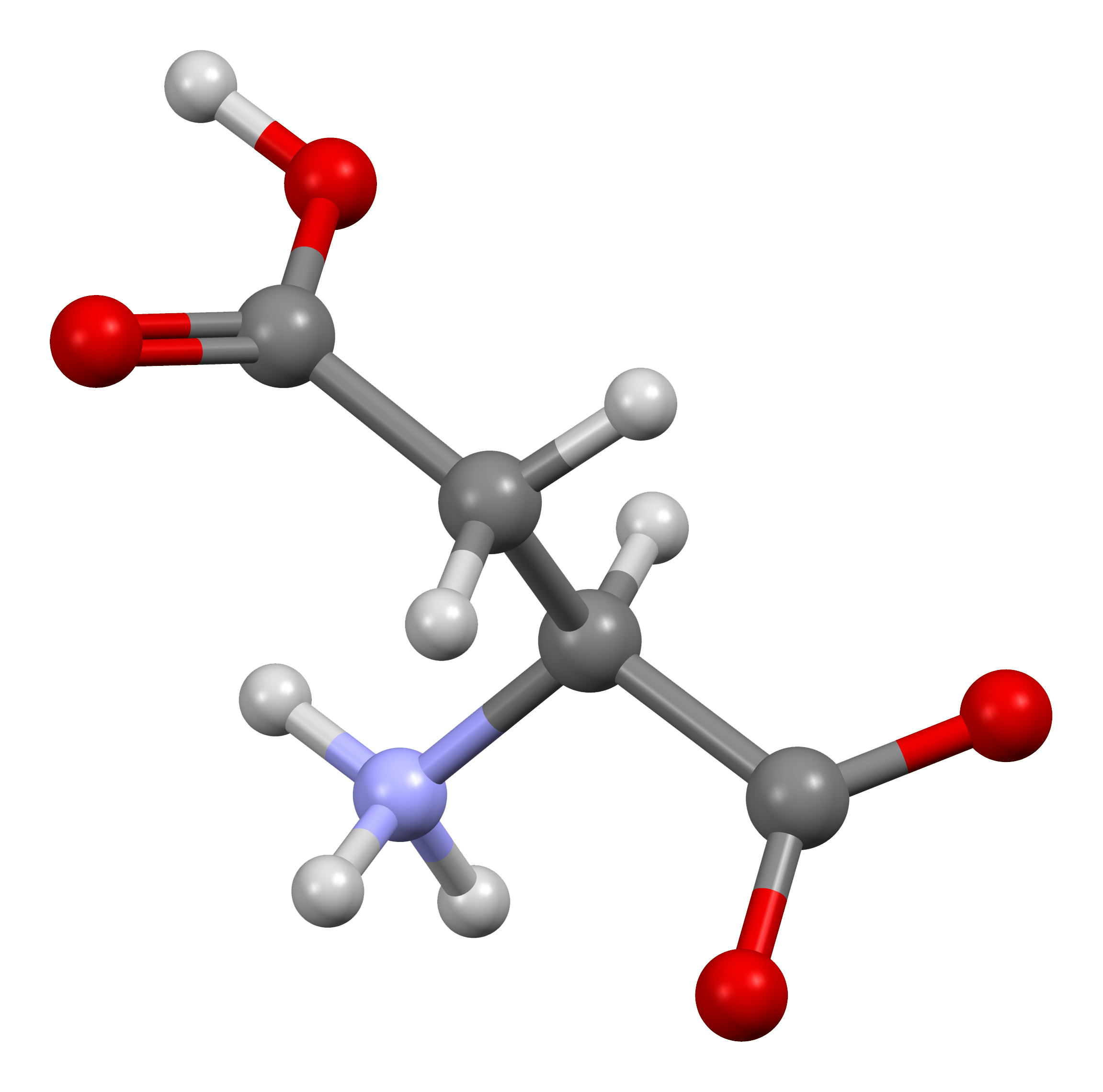
Aspartic acid (D)

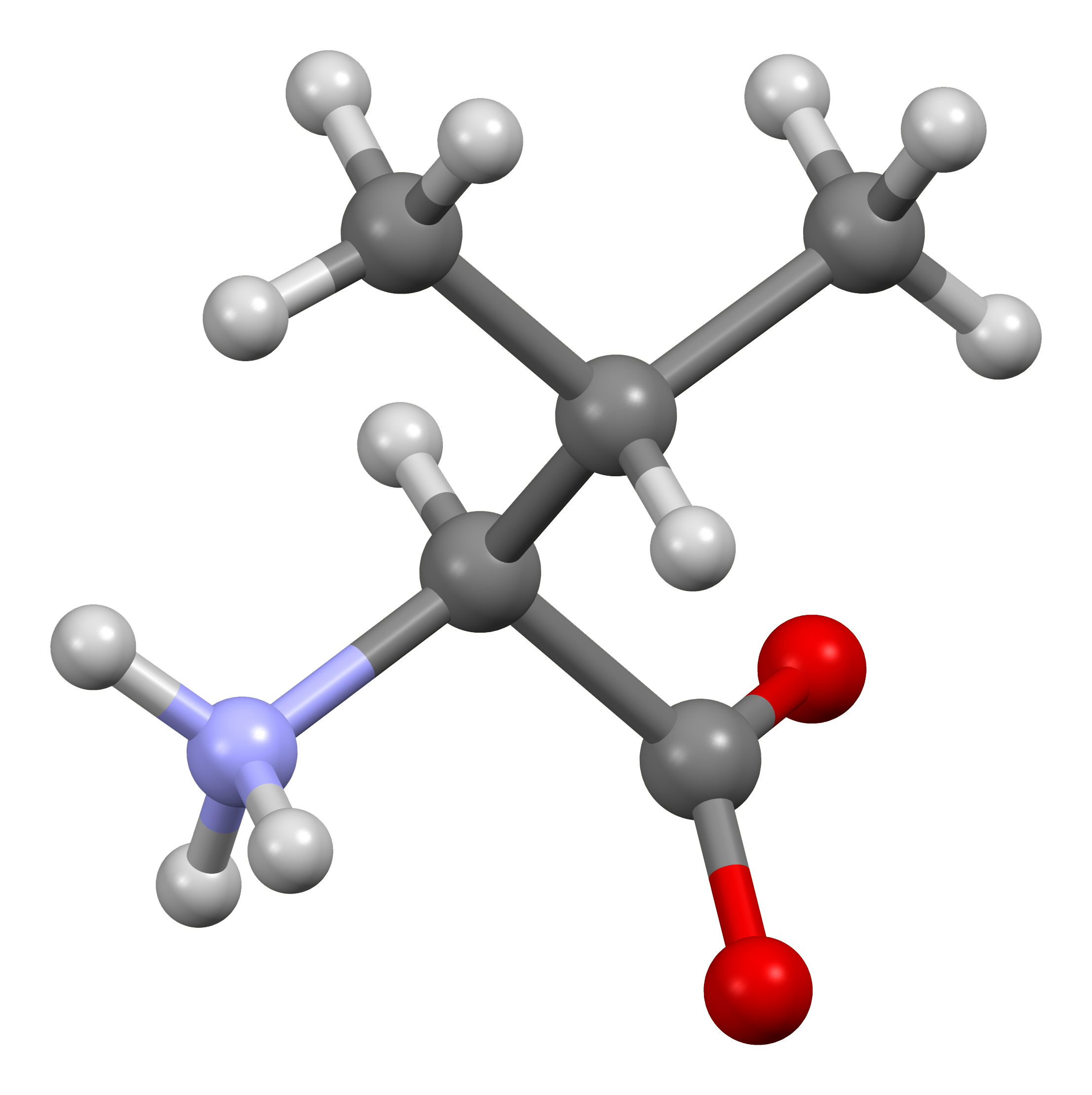
Valine (V)

The four amino acids

GADV-protein world is a hypothetical stage of abiogenesis. GADV stands for the one letter codes of four amino acids, namely, glycine (G), alanine (A), aspartic acid (D) and valine (V), the main components of GADV proteins. In the GADV-protein world hypothesis, it is argued that the prebiotic chemistry before the emergence of genes involved a stage where GADV-proteins were able to pseudo-replicate. This hypothesis is contrary to the RNA world hypothesis.

== Description ==
The GADV-protein world hypothesis was first proposed by Kenji Ikehara at Nara Women's University. It is supported by GNC-SNS primitive gene code hypothesis (GNC hypothesis) also formulated by him. In the GNC hypothesis, the origin of the present standard genetic code is considered to be the GNC genetic code that includes the codons GGC, GCC, GAC, GUC, respectively coding glycine, alanine, aspartic acid, and valine; it also follows the SNS primitive genetic code that codes ten amino acids, where N denotes arbitrary four RNA bases and S denotes guanine (G) and cytosine (C).

The GADV hypothesis proposes these mechanisms:

- Analysis on present proteins and simulation using chemical factors of amino acid shows GADV-proteins that contains almost the same amount of the four amino acids can form four basic structures of protein, namely, hydrophobic and hydrophilic structures, α-helices and β-sheets.
- Therefore, GADV-proteins polymerized from randomly chosen amino acids from the four choices, probably becoming globular and water-soluble like some present proteins.
- Proteins generated like this have different primary structures. However, their simple composition leads to the formation of similar spherical and water-soluble proteins that have bulky and hydrophobic valines inside and hydrophilic aspartic acids outside.
- GADV-peptides can polymerize by simple cycles of evaporation and hydration. This gives a rationale for the production of GADV-peptides in tide pools on the early Earth. Moreover, GADV-peptides randomly polymerized as above have the catalytic activity to hydrolyze peptide bonds in bovine serum albumin. Therefore, they can catalyze the formation of peptide bonds as the reverse reaction.
- GADV-proteins can multiply by pseudo-replication in the absence of genes, considering the features above.

== See also ==
- Alternative abiogenesis scenarios

== Related literatures ==
- Ikehara, Kenji (2005). "Possible steps to the emergence of life: The [GADV]-protein world hypothesis". The Chemical Record. 5 (2). Wiley Subscription Services, Inc., A Wiley Company: 107–118. doi:10.1002/tcr.20037. ISSN 1528-0691. PMID 15828060.
- Ikehara, Kenji (2014). "[GADV]-Protein World Hypothesis on the Origin of Life". Origins of Life and Evolution of Biospheres. 44 (4). Netherlands: Springer: 299–302. Bibcode:2014OLEB...44..299I. doi:10.1007/s11084-014-9383-4. ISSN 0169-6149. PMC 4428654. PMID 25592392.
