= Blood plasma fractionation =

Processes of separating the various components of blood plasma

Blood plasma fractionation are the general processes separating the various components of blood plasma, which in turn is a component of blood obtained through blood fractionation. Plasma-derived immunoglobulins are giving a new narrative to healthcare across a wide range of autoimmune inflammatory diseases.

== Blood plasma ==
Blood plasma is the liquid component of whole blood, and makes up approximately 55% of the total blood volume. It is composed primarily of water with small amounts of minerals, salts, ions, nutrients, and proteins in solution. In whole blood, red blood cells, leukocytes, and platelets are suspended within the plasma.

== Plasma proteins ==
Plasma contains a large variety of proteins including albumin, immunoglobulins, and clotting proteins such as fibrinogen. Albumin constitutes about 60% of the total protein in plasma and is present at concentrations between 35 and 55 mg/mL. It is the main contributor to osmotic pressure of the blood and it functions as a carrier molecule for molecules with low water solubility such as lipid-soluble hormones, enzymes, fatty acids, metal ions, and pharmaceutical compounds. Albumin is structurally stable due to its seventeen disulfide bonds and unique in that it has the highest water solubility and the lowest isoelectric point (pI) of the plasma proteins. Due to the structural integrity of albumin it remains stable under conditions where most other proteins denature.

== Plasma proteins for clinical use ==
Many of the proteins in plasma have important therapeutic uses. Albumin is commonly used to replenish and maintain blood volume after traumatic injury, during surgery, and during plasma exchange. Since albumin is the most abundant protein in the plasma its use may be the most well known, but many other proteins, although present in low concentrations, can have important clinical uses. See table below.

Examples of Plasma Components for Clinical Use
Plasma Component	Reasons for Use
factor VIII	hemophilia A
factor IX	hemophilia B
Factor X	congenital deficiency
factor XIII	congenital deficiency
PCC complex	anticoagulant overdose factor II and factor X if Factor X not available deficiencies liver disease
immunoglobulin	passive prophylaxis immune deficiency disorders some types of immune thrombocytopenic purpura Guillain–Barré syndrome Polyneuropathies
antithrombin III	congenital deficiency disseminated intravascular coagulation
fibrinogen	congenital deficiency massive haemorrhage
C1 inhibitor	hereditary angioedema
albumin	hypoalbuminemia Ascites Restoring of blood volume in trauma, burns and surgery patients
alpha-I-antitrypsin	hereditary deficiencies emphysema and COPD cirrhosis

== Plasma processing ==
When the ultimate goal of plasma processing is a purified plasma component for injection or transfusion, the plasma component must be highly pure. The first practical large-scale method of blood plasma fractionation was developed by Edwin J. Cohn during World War II. It is known as the Cohn process (or Cohn method). This process is also known as cold ethanol fractionation as it involves gradually increasing the concentration of ethanol in the solution at 5 °C and 3 °C. The Cohn Process exploits differences in properties of the various plasma proteins, specifically, the high solubility and low pI of albumin. As the ethanol concentration is increased in stages from 0% to 40% the [pH] is lowered from neutral (pH ~ 7) to about 4.8, which is near the pI of albumin. At each stage certain proteins are precipitated out of the solution and removed. The final precipitate is purified albumin. Several variations to this process exist, including an adapted method by Nitschmann and Kistler that uses fewer steps and replaces centrifugation and bulk freezing with filtration and diafiltration.

Some newer methods of albumin purification add additional purification steps to the Cohn Process and its variations, while others incorporate chromatography, with some methods being purely chromatographic. Chromatographic albumin processing as an alternative to the Cohn Process emerged in the early 1980s, however, it was not widely adopted until later due to the inadequate availability of large scale chromatography equipment. Methods incorporating chromatography generally begin with cryodepleted plasma undergoing buffer exchange via either diafiltration or buffer exchange chromatography, to prepare the plasma for following ion exchange chromatography steps. After ion exchange there are generally further chromatographic purification steps and buffer exchange.

For further information see chromatography in blood processing.

== Plasma for analytical uses ==
In addition to the clinical uses of a variety of plasma proteins, plasma has many analytical uses. Plasma contains many biomarkers that can play a role in clinical diagnosis of diseases, and separation of plasma is a necessary step in the expansion of the human plasma proteome.

=== Plasma in clinical diagnosis ===
Plasma contains an abundance of proteins many of which can be used as biomarkers, indicating the presence of certain diseases in an individual. Currently, 2D Electrophoresis is the primary method for discovery and detection of biomarkers in plasma. This involves the separation of plasma proteins on a gel by exploiting differences in their size and pI. Potential disease biomarkers may be present in plasma at very low concentrations, so, plasma samples must undergo preparation procedures for accurate results to be obtained using 2D Electrophoresis. These preparation procedures aim to remove contaminants that may interfere with detection of biomarkers, solubilize the proteins so they are able to undergo 2D Electrophoresis analysis, and prepare plasma with minimal loss of low concentration proteins, but optimal removal of high abundance proteins.

The future of laboratory diagnostics are headed toward lab-on-a-chip technology, which will bring the laboratory to the point-of-care. This involves integration of all of the steps in the analytical process, from the initial removal of plasma from whole blood to the final analytical result, on a small microfluidic device. This is advantageous because it reduces turn around time, allows for the control of variables by automation, and removes the labor-intensive and sample wasting steps in current diagnostic processes.

=== Expansion of the human plasma proteome ===
The human plasma proteome may contain thousands of proteins, however, identifying them presents challenges due to the wide range of concentrations present. Some low abundance proteins may be present in picogram (pg/mL) quantities, while high abundance proteins can be present in milligram (mg/mL) quantities. Many efforts to expand the human plasma proteome overcome this difficulty by coupling some type of high performance liquid chromatography (HPLC) or reverse phase liquid chromatography (RPLC) with high efficiency cation exchange chromatography and subsequent tandem mass spectrometry for protein identification.

== See also ==
- Blood fractionation
