= GNC hypothesis =

Hypothesis about the origin of genes

The GNC hypothesis or GNC-SNS primeval genetic code hypothesis refers to a hypothesis about the origin of genes. It suggests the universal genetic code originated not from a three-amino acid system, but from a four-amino acid system. It is this GNC code encoding [GADV]-proteins which is the most primitive genetic code. This hypothesis was first proposed by Kenji Ikehara at Nara Women's University.

== Details ==
While almost all of the organisms on Earth share the universal genetic code, in the GNC hypothesis it is argued that two primeval genetic codes preceded the present genetic code as follows:

- First, there emerged GNC primeval genetic codes involving 4 codons (GGC, GCC, GAC and GUC), which code 4 GADV-amino acids (glycine, alanine, aspartic acid and valine).
- Second, GNC code evolved to SNS primeval genetic codes involving 16 codons (GGC, GGG, GCC, GCG, GAC, GAG, GUC, GUG, CUC, GUG, CCC, CCG, CAC, CAG, CGC and CGG), which code 10 amino acids (glycine, alanine, aspartic acid, valine, glutamic acid, leucine, proline, histidine, glutamine, arginine).

The GNC hypothesis is based on the following facts:

- Proteins composed of GADV-amino acids coded by GNC primeval genetic code can form four fundamental structures found in proteins in present organisms, namely, hydrophobic and hydrophilic structures, α-helices, β-sheets, and turns (or coils).
- Proteins composed of ten amino acids coded by SNS primeval genetic code can form six fundamental structures, namely, hydrophobic and hydrophilic structures, α-helices, β-sheets, turns, acidic and basic fragments.

== Related literatures ==
Ikehara, Kenji; Omori, Yoko; Arai, Rieko; Hirose, Akiko (2002). "A Novel Theory on the Origin of the Genetic Code: A GNC-SNS Hypothesis". Journal of Molecular Evolution. 54 (4): 530–538. Bibcode:2002JMolE..54..530I. doi:10.1007/s00239-001-0053-6. PMID 11956691.

== See also ==
- GADV protein world
