= Hypoxia preconditioned plasma =

Type of cultured blood plasma

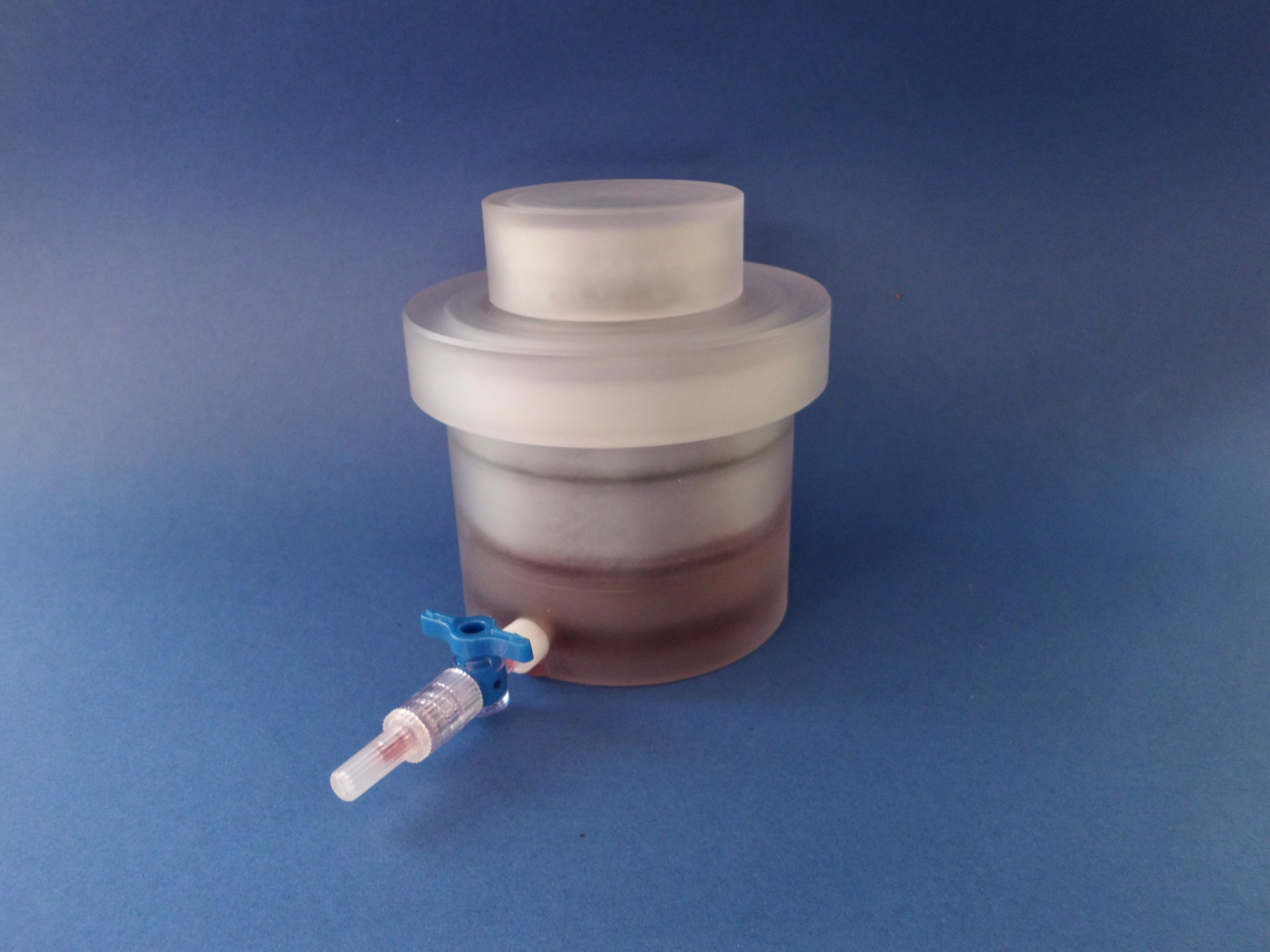
Image of a prototype bioreactor device for one-step preparation and sampling of Hypoxia Preconditioned Plasma (HPP)

Hypoxia preconditioned plasma or hypoxia pre-conditioned plasma (abbreviated as HPP) is the (cell-free) plasma obtained after extracorporeal conditioning (i.e. culturing) of anticoagulated blood under physiological temperature (37 °C) and physiological hypoxia (1–5 %O_{2}). Blood conditioning is typically carried out over 2 to 4 days.

No high quality evidence supports its use for any medical purpose as of 2016.
