= Diag Human case =

The Diag Human case relates to a Liechtenstein-incorporated blood plasma trading company, established by Swiss-Czech entrepreneur Josef Šťáva (born 17 March 1950 in Prague) in the 1980s. The stated aim of the company was to help "currency-deficient Eastern Bloc states acquire modern blood plasma technology". The company received media attention in the 1996, when it filed a lawsuit against the Czech government in Prague Commercial Court, for defamation and unfair competition. The company claimed that the Health Minister had contacted Novo Nordisk, a major business partner of Diag Human, to dissuade the company from doing business with them, which led to the failure of Diag Human's business in the country. The two parties agreed to enter arbitration, and the case became one of the largest cases of commercial litigation in the history of Czech Republic. In 2008, the court found in favour of Diag Human, awarding around $650 million to the company.
