= Edwin Joseph Cohn =

American biochemist (1892–1953)

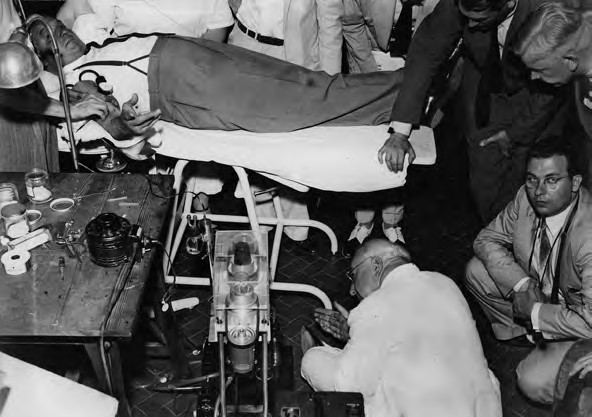
- Born: December 17, 1892; New York City
- Died: October 1, 1953 (aged 60); Boston
- Education: Phillips Academy, Andover; University of Chicago, PhD 1917
- Known for: blood fractionation
- Spouses: Marianne Brettauer, Rebekah Higginson
- Parents: Abraham Cohn (father); Maimie Einstein Cohn (mother)
- Awards: Medal for Merit, and numerous others
- Scientific career
- Fields: Biochemistry
- Workplaces: Harvard Medical School
- Notable students: Frederic M. Richards

Edwin Joseph Cohn (December 17, 1892 – October 1, 1953) was a protein scientist. A graduate of Phillips Academy, Andover [1911], and the University of Chicago [1914, PhD 1917], he made important advances in the physical chemistry of proteins, and was responsible for the blood fractionation project that saved thousands of lives in World War II.

== Liver juice fractionation and concentration for treatment of pernicious anemia ==
In 1928, as group leader at Harvard Medical School, Cohn was able to concentrate, by a factor of 50 to 100 times, the vital factor in raw liver juice which had been shown by Minot and Murphy to be the only known specific treatment for pernicious anemia. Cohn's contribution allowed practical treatment of this previously incurable and fatal illness for the next 20 years.

== Blood fractionation project ==
Cohn became famous for his work on blood fractionation during World War II. In particular, he worked out the techniques for isolating the serum albumin fraction of blood plasma, which is essential for maintaining the osmotic pressure in the blood vessels, preventing their collapse. Transfusions with purified albumin on the battlefield rescued thousands of soldiers from shock.

After the war, Cohn worked to develop systems by which every component of donated blood would be used, so that nothing would be wasted.

On Cohn's office blackboard was inscribed a quotation from Goethe's Faust: "Das Blut ist ein ganz besonderer Saft." (Blood is a very special juice.)

== Physical chemistry of proteins ==
Cohn is also well-remembered for his studies of the physical chemistry of proteins, particularly his general "salting out" equation for protein solubility (1925)

$$\log K_{p} = - \alpha_{S} [S] + \beta_{S}$$

where $K_{p}$ is the protein solubility constant and $\alpha_{S}$ and $\beta_{S}$ are constants characteristic of the particular ion S whose concentration (or, more correctly, activity) is [S]. This equation is identical to the Setschenow solubility equation.

In 1943, Cohn and John Edsall published Proteins, Amino Acids and Peptides, a book that summarized the known physical chemistry of proteins and deeply influenced succeeding generations of protein scientists. Cohn was a long-time collaborator and friend of another important physical chemist, George Scatchard.

== Personality ==
Cohn was elected to the American Academy of Arts and Sciences in 1926, the United States National Academy of Sciences in 1943, and the American Philosophical Society in 1949.

He would often give public demonstrations of the blood fractionation machine, in which he would fractionate his own blood on stage during the lecture. In one such lecture, at the Instituto Superior Técnico in Lisbon, the machine became blocked (without Cohn's knowledge) and exploded, showering the first few rows of the audience with Cohn's blood. Cohn maintained his composure, however, and continued his lecture without significant interruption.

Cohn died on October 1, 1953, in Boston, from a stroke brought on by hypertension caused by an undiagnosed pheochromocytoma.
