= Chromatography in blood processing =

Chromatography is a physical method of separation that distributes the components you want to separate between two phases, one stationary (stationary phase), the other (the mobile phase) moving in a definite direction. Cold ethanol precipitation, developed by Cohn in 1946, manipulates pH, ionic strength, ethanol concentration and temperature to precipitate different protein fractions from plasma. Chromatographic techniques utilise ion exchange, gel filtration and affinity resins to separate proteins. Since the 1980s it has emerged as an effective method of purifying blood components for therapeutic use.

== Human blood plasma ==
Blood plasma is the liquid component of blood, which contains dissolved proteins, nutrients, ions, and other soluble components. In whole blood, red blood cells, white blood cells, and platelets are suspended within the plasma. The goal of plasma purification and processing is to extract specific materials that are present in blood, and use them for restoration and repair. There are several components that make up blood plasma, one of which is the protein albumin. Albumin is a highly water-soluble protein with considerable structural stability. It serves as a transportation device for materials such as hormones, enzymes, fatty acids, metal ions, and medicinal products. It is also used for therapeutic purposes, being essential in restoration and maintenance of circulating blood volume in imperative situations such as severe trauma or surgery. With little room for error, extremely pure samples that are lacking impurities needs to be at hand in good amount. Human blood plasma is important for the body so the nutrients etc. can be stored.

== Development of chromatography ==
Traditionally, the Cohn process incorporating cold ethanol fractionation has been used for albumin purification. However, chromatographic methods for separation started being adopted in the early 1980s. Developments were ongoing in the time period between when Cohn fractionation started being used, in 1946, and when chromatography started being used, in 1983. In 1962, the Kistler & Nistchmann process was created which was a spinoff of the Cohn process. Chromatographic processes began to take shape in 1983. In the 1990s, the Zenalb and the CSL Albumex processes were created which incorporated chromatography with a few variations.

The general approach to using chromatography for plasma fractionation for albumin is: recovery of supernatant I, delipidation, anion exchange chromatography, cation exchange chromatography, and gel filtration chromatography.

The recovered purified material is formulated with combinations of sodium octanoate and sodium N-acetyl tryptophanate and then subjected to viral inactivation procedures, including pasteurisation at 60 °C.

This is a more efficient alternative than the Cohn process for four main reasons: 1) smooth automation and a relatively inexpensive plant was needed, 2) easier to sterilize equipment and maintain a good manufacturing environment, 3) chromatographic processes are less damaging to the albumin protein, and 4) a more successful albumin end result can be achieved.

Compared with the Cohn process, the albumin purity went up from about 95% to 98% using chromatography, and the yield increased from about 65% to 85%. Small percentage increases make a difference in regard to sensitive measurements like purity. There is one big drawback in using chromatography, which has to do with the economics of the process. Although the method was efficient from the processing aspect, acquiring the necessary equipment is a big task. Large machinery is necessary, and for a long time the lack of equipment availability was not conducive to its widespread use. The components are more readily available now but it is still a work in progress and will possibly be ready in the future to help the world.

== Bridging Methods ==
Integrating traditional and modern methods is a useful way to process albumin.

There are three main steps that combine Cohn fractionation with chromatography: 1) factors I, II, and III are removed via cold ethanol fractionation, 2) Sepharose fast flow ion exchange and sepharose fast flow chromatography procedures are run, and 3) gel filtration is run. The result is albumin with 9% lower aluminum levels with a processing time that is almost twice as fast.

Although it was hard to make chromatographic processing methods widely adopted, global expansion is a work in progress. Various blood components must be readily available at various medical treatment centers around the world. The Institute of Transfusion Medicine in Skopje, North Macedonia is a plasma fractionation center in the Balkans. Their modernized albumin purification process consists of five steps:

1. Starting material is plasma that has been pretreated by centrifugation,
2. A round of gel filtration is run,
3. ion exchange on DEAE Sepharose is run to bind the albumin to the column,
4. Albumin is eluted with a sodium acetate buffer, and
5. Final polishing with gel filtration.

The end result is a pure and safe batch of albumin that is 100% non-pyrogenic, sterile, and free of active HIV virus. The product purity is greater than 98%, and the protein content is about 50 g/L.

== Non-chromatographic processing methods ==
Other plasma processing methods exist, but generally do not provide the resolution or purity of chromatographic methods. Two-phase liquid extraction may be performed using polyethylene glycol (PEG)-phosphate Aqueous two-phase systems, with a PEG-rich top layer and a phosphate-rich bottom layer. Although this method is somewhat useful for protein recovery, it does not work as well for the recovery of other blood components. Membrane fractionation has the advantage of minimal protein loss yet high removal of pathological plasma components. This method incorporates processes such as thermofiltration and applying pulsate flow. The latest two-stage membrane system utilizes a high flow recirculation circuit that is effective for removal of LDL cholesterol. It may prove useful for patients that have clogged arteries and other cardiovascular problems involving cholesterol. Batch adsorption, e.g. onto ion exchange media, is only useful when dealing with smaller samples of plasma, typically 200 mL or less. Batch adsorption recovers the product in a larger volume of elution buffer than does column chromatography or frontal chromatography, and the resulting more dilute product requires concentration, typically on a membrane system, which can lead to loss of product by irreversible adsorption to the membrane.
