= Blood fractionation =

Separation of blood into its components

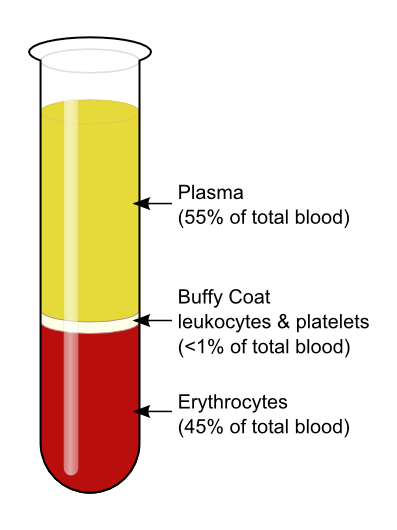
Blood components after centrifugation.

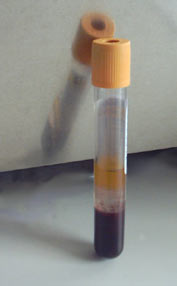
When blood is collected into a serum-separating tube (SST) and centrifuged, the serum becomes isolated from the red blood cells by a gel acting as a physical barrier to prevent inadvertent remixing of the components.

Blood fractionation is the process of fractionating whole blood, or separating it into its component parts. This is typically done by centrifuging the blood.

The resulting components are:

- a clear solution of blood plasma in the upper phase (which can be separated into its own fractions, see Blood plasma fractionation),
- the buffy coat, which is a thin layer of leukocytes (white blood cells) mixed with platelets in the middle, and
- erythrocytes (red blood cells) at the bottom of the centrifuge tube.

Serum separation tubes (SSTs) are tubes used in phlebotomy containing a silicone gel; when centrifuged the silicone gel forms a layer on top of the buffy coat, allowing the blood serum to be removed more effectively for testing and related purposes.

As an alternative to energy-consuming centrifugation, more energy-efficient technologies have been studied, such as ultrasonic fractionation.

== Plasma protein fractionation ==
Plasma proteins are separated by using the inherent differences of each protein. Fractionation involves changing the conditions of the pooled plasma (e.g., the temperature or the acidity) so that proteins that are normally dissolved in the plasma fluid become insoluble, forming large clumps, called precipitate. The insoluble protein can be collected by centrifugation. One of the very effective ways for carrying out this process is the addition of alcohol to the plasma membrane pool while simultaneously cooling the pool. This process is sometimes called cold alcohol fractionation or ethanol fractionation. It was described by and bears the eponym of Dr Edwin J. Cohn. This procedure is carried out in a series of steps so that a single pool of plasma yields several different protein products, such as albumin and immune globulin. Human serum albumin prepared by this process is used in some vaccines, for treating burn victims, and other medical applications.

== See also ==
- Blood plasma fractionation
