= Blood plasma =

Liquid component of blood

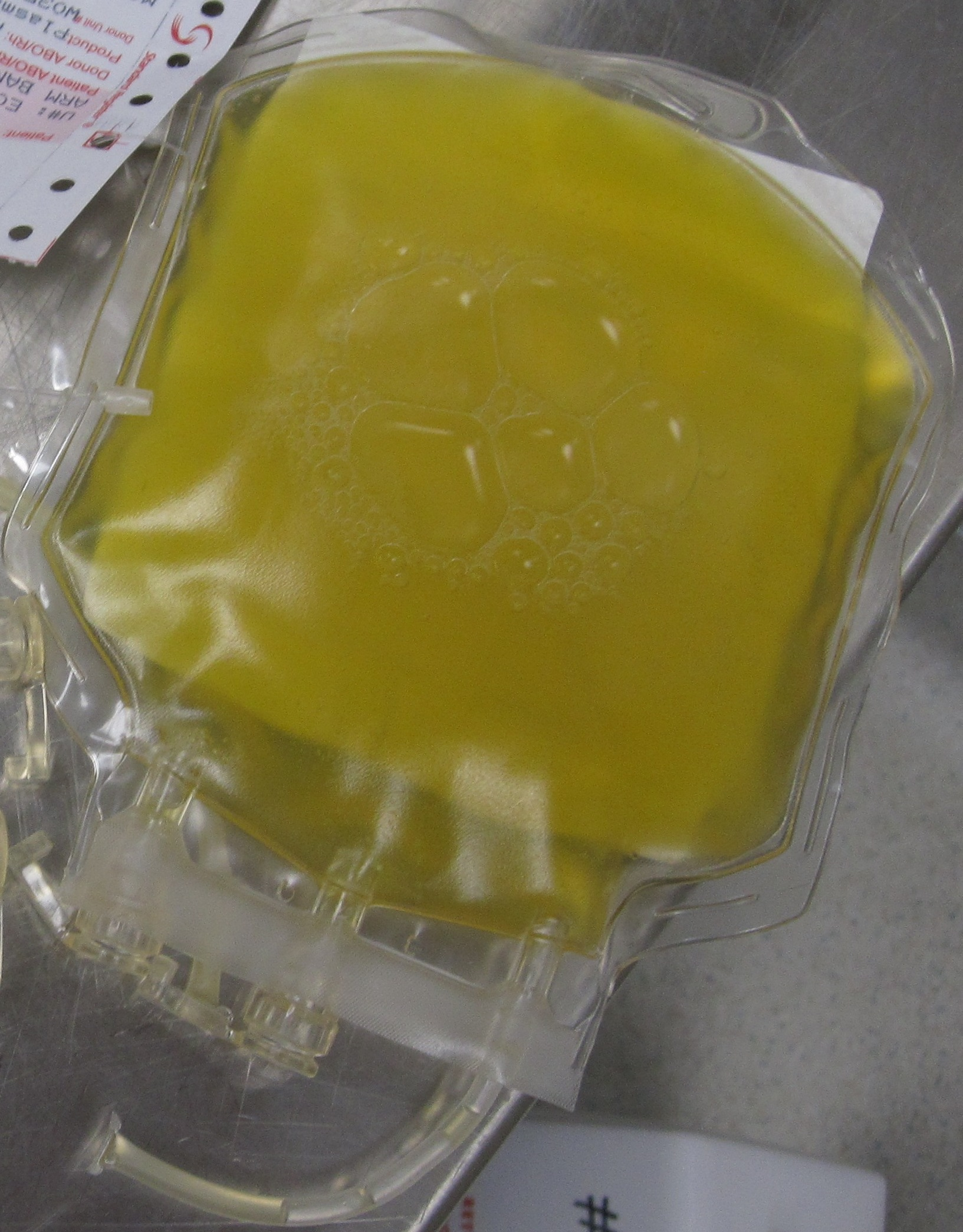
A unit of donated fresh plasma

Blood plasma is a light amber-colored liquid component of blood in which blood cells are absent, but which contains proteins and other constituents of whole blood in suspension. It makes up about 55% of the body's total blood volume. It is the intravascular part of extracellular fluid (all body fluid outside cells). It is mostly water (up to 95% by volume), and contains important dissolved proteins (6–8%; e.g., serum albumins, globulins, and fibrinogen), glucose, clotting factors, electrolytes (Na^{+}, Ca^{2+}, Mg^{2+}, HCO_{3}^{−}, Cl^{−}, etc.), hormones, carbon dioxide (plasma being the main medium for excretory product transportation), and oxygen. It plays a vital role in an intravascular osmotic effect that keeps electrolyte concentration balanced and protects the body from infection and other blood-related disorders.

Blood plasma can be separated from whole blood through blood fractionation, by adding an anticoagulant to a tube filled with blood, which is spun in a centrifuge until the blood cells fall to the bottom of the tube. The blood plasma is then poured or drawn off. For point-of-care testing applications, plasma can be extracted from whole blood via filtration or via agglutination to allow for rapid testing of specific biomarkers. Blood plasma has a density of approximately 1,025 kg/m^{3} (1.025 g/ml). Blood serum is blood plasma without clotting factors. Plasmapheresis is a medical therapy that involves blood plasma extraction, treatment, and reintegration.

Fresh frozen plasma is on the WHO Model List of Essential Medicines, the most important medications needed in a basic health system. It is of critical importance in the treatment of many types of trauma that result in blood loss, and is therefore kept stocked universally in all medical facilities capable of treating trauma (e.g., trauma centers, hospitals, and ambulances) or that pose a risk of patient blood loss, such as surgical suite facilities.

== Volume ==
Reference ranges for blood tests, showing normal mass concentration of blood plasma constituents

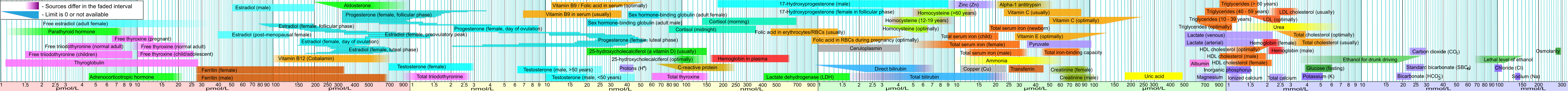
The same information, shown in molarity rather than mass

Blood plasma volume may be expanded by or drained to extravascular fluid when there are changes in Starling forces across capillary walls. For example, when blood pressure drops in circulatory shock, Starling forces drive fluid into the interstitium, causing third spacing.

Standing still for a prolonged period will cause an increase in transcapillary hydrostatic pressure. As a result, approximately 12% of blood plasma volume will cross into the extravascular compartment. This plasma shift causes an increase in hematocrit, serum total protein, blood viscosity and, as a result of increased concentration of coagulation factors, it causes orthostatic hypercoagulability.

== Plasma proteins ==
=== Albumins ===
Serum albumins are the most common plasma proteins, and they are responsible for maintaining the osmotic pressure of the blood. Without albumins, the consistency of blood would be closer to that of water. The increased viscosity of blood prevents fluid from entering the bloodstream from outside the capillaries. Albumins are produced in the liver, assuming the absence of a hepatocellular deficiency.

=== Globulins ===
The second most common type of protein in the blood plasma is globulins. Important globulins include immunoglobins which are important for the immune system, and transport hormones and other compounds around the body. There are three main types of globulins. Alpha-1 and Alpha-2 globulins are formed in the liver and play an important role in mineral transport and the inhibition of blood coagulation. An example of beta globulin found in blood plasma includes low-density lipoproteins (LDL) which are responsible for transporting fat to the cells for steroid and membrane synthesis. Gamma globulin, better known as immunoglobulins, are produced by plasma B cells, and provides the human body with a defense system against invading pathogens and other immune diseases.

=== Fibrinogen ===
Fibrinogen proteins make up most of the remaining proteins in the blood. Fibrinogens are responsible for clotting blood to help prevent blood loss.

== Color ==
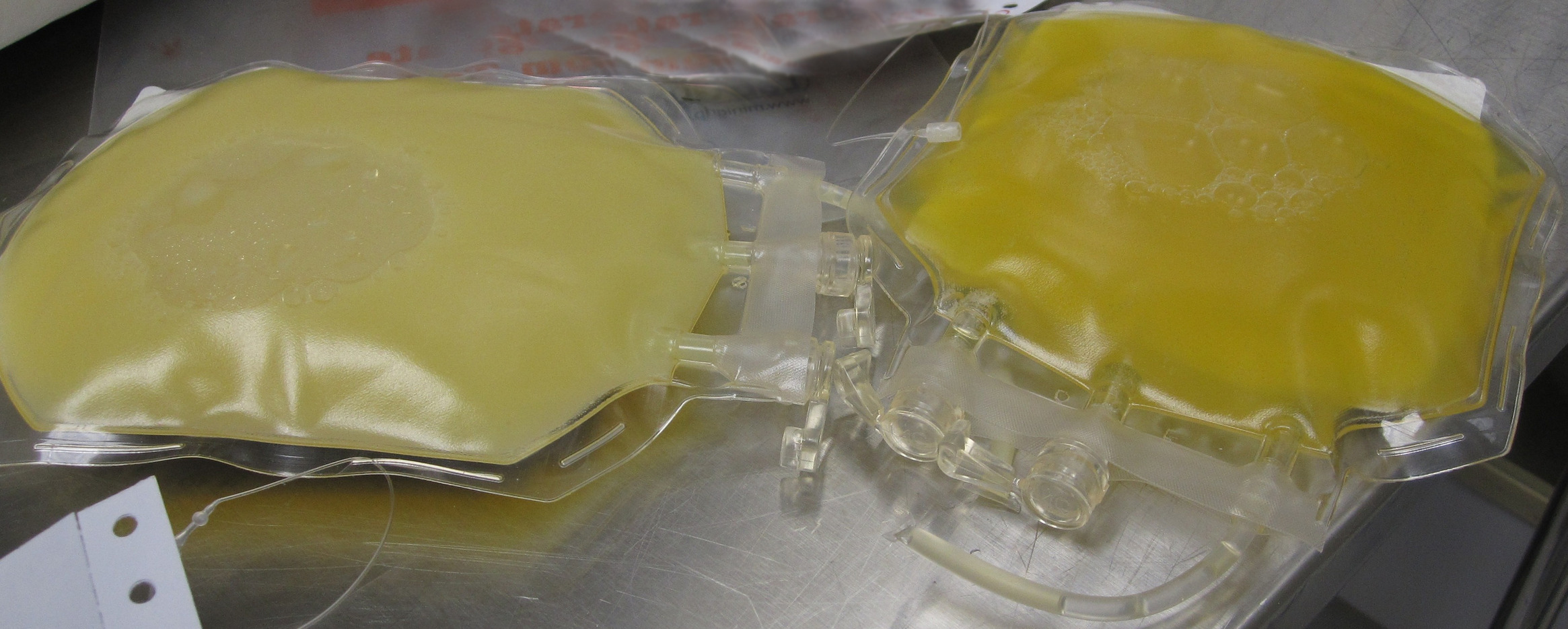
Bags of frozen plasma, from a person with hypercholesterolemia (left) and typical plasma (right)

Plasma is normally yellow due to bilirubin, carotenoids, hemoglobin, and transferrin. In abnormal cases, plasma can have varying shades of orange, green, or brown. The green color can be due to ceruloplasmin or sulfhemoglobin. The latter may form due to medicines that are able to form sulfonamides once ingested. A dark brown or reddish color can appear due to hemolysis, in which methemoglobin is released from broken blood cells. Plasma is normally relatively transparent, but sometimes it can be opaque. Opaqueness is typically due to elevated content of lipids like cholesterol and triglycerides.

== Plasma vs. serum in medical diagnostics ==
Plasma and serum are both derived from full blood, but serum is obtained by removing blood cells, fibrin clots, and other coagulation factors while plasma is obtained by only removing blood cells. Blood plasma and blood serum are often used in blood tests. Tests can be done on plasma, serum or both. In addition, some tests have to be done with whole blood, such as the determination of the amount of blood cells in blood via flow cytometry.

=== Benefits of plasma over serum ===
Plasma preparation is quick, as it is not coagulated. Serum sample preparation requires about 30 minutes of waiting time before it can be centrifuged and then analyzed. However, coagulation can be hastened down to a few minutes by adding thrombin or similar agents to the serum sample.

Compared to serum, 15–20% larger volume of plasma can be obtained from a blood sample of certain size. Serum lacks some proteins that partake in coagulation and increase the sample volume.

Serum preparation can cause measurement errors by increasing or decreasing the concentration of the analyte that is meant to be measured. For example, during coagulation, blood cells consume blood glucose and platelets increase the sample content of compounds like potassium, phosphates and aspartate transaminase by secreting them. Glucose or these other compounds may be the analytes.

=== Benefits of serum over plasma ===
Plasma preparation requires the addition of anticoagulants, which can cause expected and unexpected measurement errors. For example, anticoagulant salts can add extra cations like NH_{4}^{+}, Li^{+}, Na^{+} and K^{+} to the sample, or impurities like lead and aluminum. Chelator anticoagulants like EDTA and citrate salts work by binding calcium (see carboxyglutamic acid), but they may also bind other ions. Even if such ions are not the analytes, chelators can interfere with enzyme activity measurements. For example, EDTA binds zinc ions, which alkaline phosphatases need as cofactors. Thus, phosphatase activity cannot be measured if EDTA is used.

An unknown volume of anticoagulants can be added to a plasma sample by accident, which may ruin the sample as the analyte concentration is changed by an unknown amount.

No anticoagulants are added to serum samples, which decreases the preparation cost of the samples relative to plasma samples.

Plasma samples can form tiny clots if the added anticoagulant is not properly mixed with the sample. Non-uniform samples can cause measurement errors.

== History ==
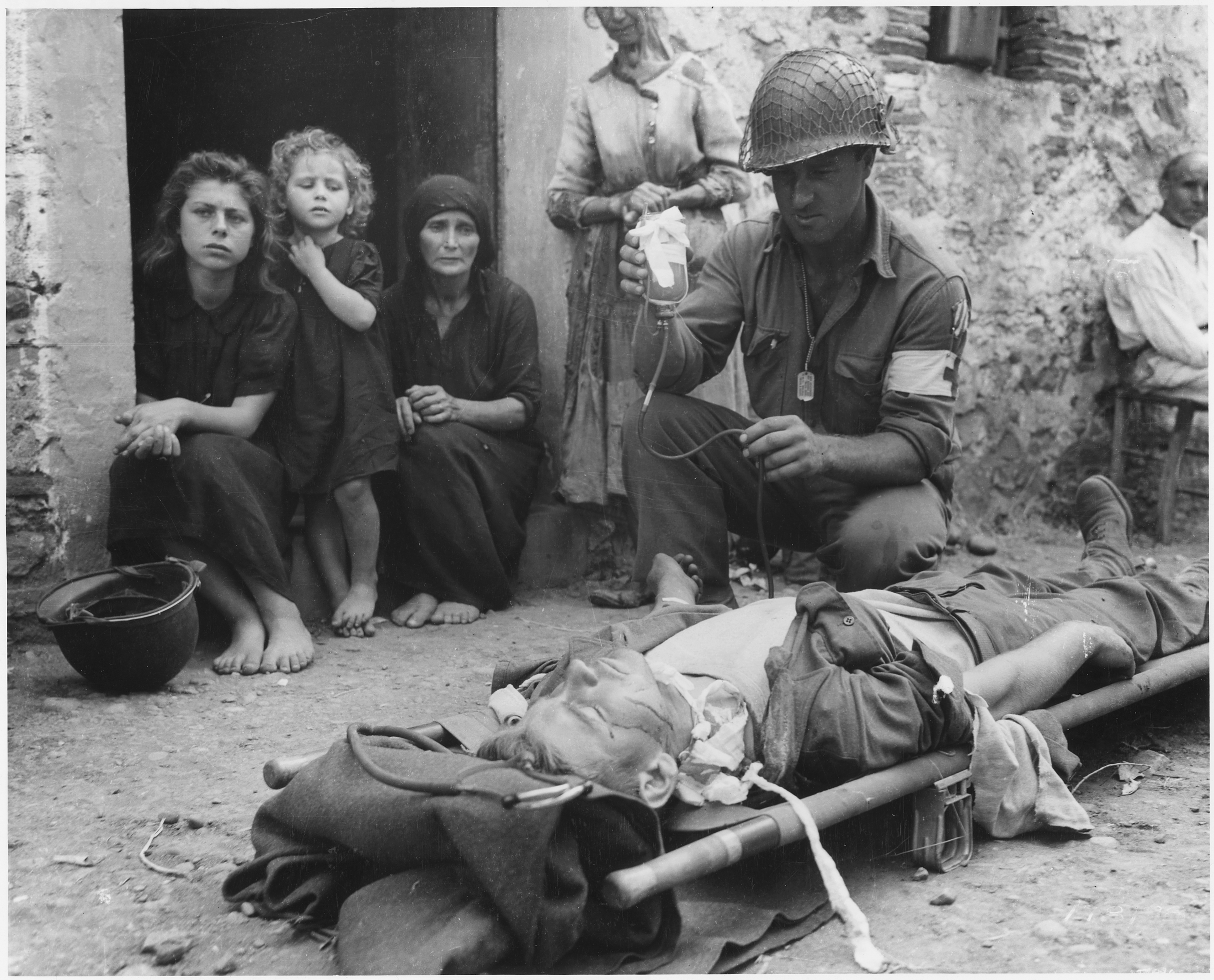
Private Roy W. Humphrey is being given blood plasma after he was wounded by shrapnel in Sicily in August 1943.

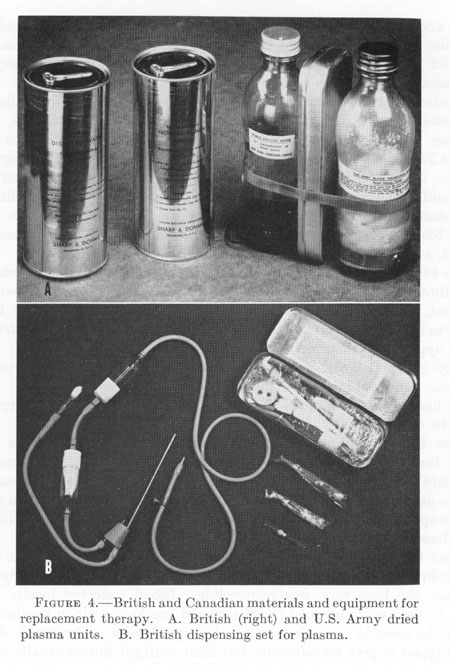
Dried plasma packages used by the British and US militaries during WWII

Plasma was already well known when described by William Harvey in de Motu Cordis in 1628, but knowledge of it probably dates as far back as Vesalius (1514–1564). Upon the formation of a clot, the remaining clear fluid (if any) is blood serum, which is essentially plasma without the clotting factors

The use of blood plasma as a substitute for whole blood and for transfusion purposes was proposed in March 1918, in the correspondence columns of the British Medical Journal, by Gordon R. Ward. "Dried plasmas" in powder or strips of material format were developed and first used in World War II. Prior to the United States' involvement in the war, liquid plasma and whole blood were used.

=== The origin of plasmapheresis ===
Dr. José Antonio Grifols Lucas, a scientist from Vilanova i la Geltrú, Spain, founded Laboratorios Grifols in 1940. Dr. Grifols pioneered a first-of-its-kind technique called plasmapheresis, where a donor's red blood cells would be returned to the donor's body almost immediately after the separation of the blood plasma. This technique is still in practice today, almost 80 years later. In 1945, Dr. Grifols opened the world's first plasma donation center.

=== Blood for Britain ===
The Blood for Britain program during the early 1940s was quite successful (and popular in the United States) based on Charles Drew's contribution. A large project began in August 1940 to collect blood in New York City hospitals for the export of plasma to Britain. Drew was appointed medical supervisor of the "Plasma for Britain" project. His notable contribution at this time was to transform the test tube methods of many blood researchers into the first successful mass production techniques.

Nevertheless, the decision was made to develop a dried plasma package for the armed forces as it would reduce breakage and make the transportation, packaging, and storage much simpler. The resulting dried plasma package came in two tin cans containing 400 cc bottles. One bottle contained enough distilled water to reconstitute the dried plasma contained within the other bottle. In about three minutes, the plasma would be ready to use and could stay fresh for around four hours. The Blood for Britain program operated successfully for five months, with total collections of almost 15,000 people donating blood, and with over 5,500 vials of blood plasma.

Following the Supplying Blood Plasma to England project, Drew was named director of the Red Cross blood bank and assistant director of the National Research Council, in charge of blood collection for the United States Army and Navy. Drew argued against the armed forces directive that blood/plasma was to be separated by the race of the donor. Drew insisted that there was no racial difference in human blood and that the policy would lead to needless deaths as soldiers and sailors were required to wait for "same race" blood.

By the end of the war the American Red Cross had provided enough blood for over six million plasma packages. Most of the surplus plasma was returned to the United States for civilian use. Serum albumin replaced dried plasma for combat use during the Korean War.

== Plasma donation ==
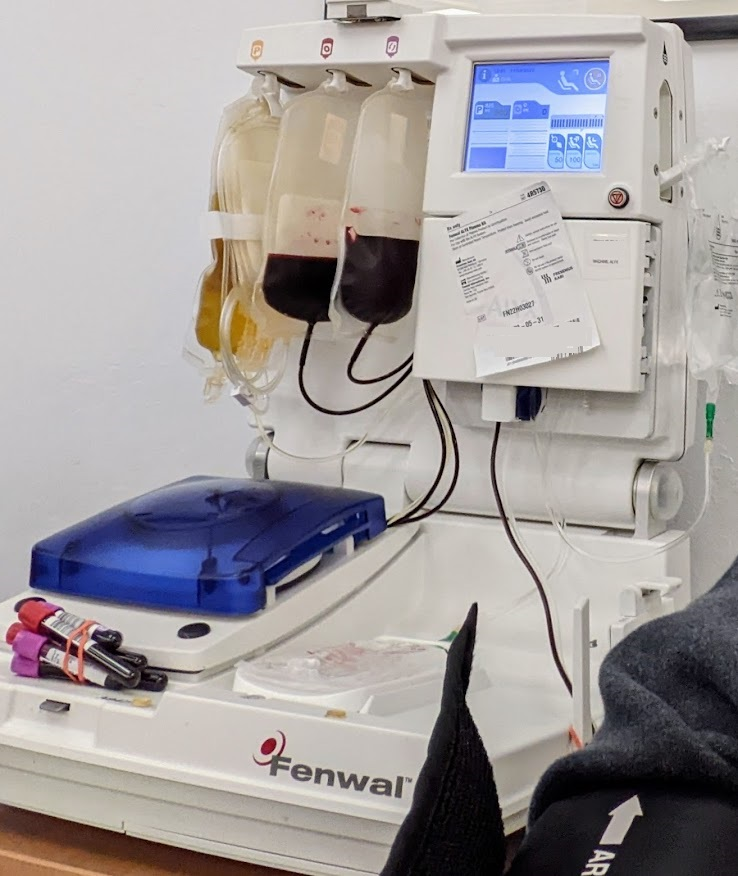
A machine being used for plasma donation

Plasma as a blood product prepared from blood donations is used in blood transfusions, typically as fresh frozen plasma (FFP) or Plasma Frozen within 24 hours after phlebotomy (PF24). When donating whole blood or packed red blood cell (PRBC) transfusions, O- is the most desirable and is considered a "universal donor," since it has neither A nor B antigens and can be safely transfused to most recipients. Type AB+ is the "universal recipient" type for PRBC donations. However, for plasma the situation is somewhat reversed. Blood donation centers will sometimes collect only plasma from AB donors through apheresis, as their plasma does not contain the antibodies that may cross react with recipient antigens. As such, AB is often considered the "universal donor" for plasma. Special programs exist just to cater to the male AB plasma donor, because of concerns about transfusion related acute lung injury (TRALI) and female donors who may have higher leukocyte antibodies. However, some studies show an increased risk of TRALI despite increased leukocyte antibodies in women who have been pregnant.

=== United Kingdom ===
Following fears of variant Creutzfeldt–Jakob disease (vCJD) being spread through the blood supply, the British government began to phase out blood plasma from U.K. donors and by the end of 1999 had imported all blood products made with plasma from the United States. In 2002, the British government purchased Life Resources Incorporated, an American blood supply company, to import plasma. The company became Plasma Resources UK (PRUK) which owned Bio Products Laboratory. In 2013, the British government sold an 80% stake in PRUK to American hedge fund Bain Capital, in a deal estimated to be worth £200 million. The sale was met with criticism in the UK. In 2009, the U.K. stopped importing plasma from the United States, as it was no longer a viable option due to regulatory and jurisdictional challenges.

At present (2024), blood donated in the United Kingdom is used by UK Blood Services for the manufacture of plasma blood components (Fresh Frozen Plasma (FFP) and cryoprecipitate). As of 2025, NHS patients have received medicines made from plasma and blood donors in England.

== Synthetic blood plasma ==
Simulated body fluid (SBF) is a solution having a similar ion concentration to that of human blood plasma. SBF is normally used for the surface modification of metallic implants, and more recently in gene delivery application.

== See also ==
- Blood plasma fractionation
- Chromatography in blood processing
- Diag Human
- Hypoxia preconditioned plasma
- Intravascular volume status
